The International Classification of Diseases for Oncology (ICD-O) is a domain-specific extension of the International Statistical Classification of Diseases and Related Health Problems for tumor diseases. This classification is widely used by cancer registries.

It is currently in its third revision (ICD-O-3). ICD-10 includes a list of morphology codes.  They stem from ICD-O second edition (ICD-O-2) that was valid at the time of publication.

Axes 
The classification has two axes: topography and morphology.

Morphology 
The morphology axis addresses the microscopic structure (histology) of the tumor.

This axis has particular importance because the Systematized Nomenclature of Medicine ("SNOMED") has adopted the ICD-O classification of morphology. SNOMED has been changing continuously, and several different versions of SNOMED are in use. Accordingly, mapping of ICD-O codes to SNOMED requires careful assessment of whether entities are indeed true matches.

Topography 
The topography axis addresses the tumor's site in the body. It is standardized with the C section of ICD-10.

There were no changes in the topography axis between ICD-O-2 and ICD-O-3.

See List of ICD-10 codes#(C00–C97) Malignant Neoplasms for examples.

International Classification of Diseases for Oncology, Third Edition (ICD-O-3)

5th Digit Behaviour Code for Neoplasms 
 /0 Benign
 /1 Uncertain whether benign or malignant
 Borderline malignancy
 Low malignant potential
 Uncertain malignant potential
 /2 Carcinoma in situ
 Intraepithelial
 Noninfiltrating
 Noninvasive
 /3 Malignant, primary site
 /6 Malignant, metastatic site
Malignant, secondary site
 /9 Malignant, uncertain whether primary or metastatic site

Morphology Codes (ICD-O-3)

800 Neoplasms, NOS 
M8000/0 Neoplasm, benign
 Tumor, benign
 Unclassified tumor, benign

M8000/1 Neoplasm, uncertain whether benign or malignant
 Neoplasm, NOS
 Tumor, NOS
 Unclassified tumor, uncertain whether benign or malignant
 Unclassified tumor, borderline malignancy

M8000/3 Neoplasm, malignant
 Tumor, malignant, NOS
 Malignancy
 Cancer
 Unclassified tumor, malignant
 Blastoma, NOS

M8000/6 Neoplasm, metastatic
 Neoplasm, metastatic
 Tumor, metastatic
 Tumor, secondary
 Tumor embolus

M8000/9 Neoplasm, malignant, uncertain whether primary or metastatic
 Unclassified tumor, malignant, uncertain whether primary or metastatic

M8001/0 Tumor cells, benign

M8001/1 Tumor cells, uncertain whether benign or malignant
 Tumor cells, NOS

M8001/3 Tumor cells, malignant

M8002/3 Malignant tumor, small cell type

M8003/3 Malignant tumor, giant cell type

M8004/3 Malignant tumor, spindle cell type
 Malignant tumor, fusiform cell type

M8005/0 Clear cell tumor, NOS

M8005/3 Malignant tumor, clear cell type

801–804 Epithelial Neoplasms, NOS 
 M8010/0 Epithelial tumor, benign
 M8010/2 Carcinoma in situ, NOS
 Intraepithelial carcinoma, NOS
 M8010/3 Carcinoma, NOS
 Epithelial tumor, malignant
 M8010/6 Carcinoma, metastatic, NOS
 Secondary carcinoma
 M8010/9 Carcinomatosis
 M8011/0 Epithelioma, benign
 M8011/3 Epithelioma, malignant
 Epithelioma, NOS
 M8012/3 Large cell carcinoma, NOS
 M8013/3 Large cell neuroendocrine carcinoma
 M8014/3 Large cell carcinoma with rhabdoid phenotype
 M8015/3 Glassy cell carcinoma
 M8020/3 Carcinoma, undifferentiated, NOS
 M8021/3 Carcinoma, anaplastic, NOS
 M8022/3 Pleomorphic carcinoma
 M8030/3 Giant cell and spindle cell carcinoma
 M8031/3 Giant cell carcinoma
 M8032/3 Spindle cell carcinoma, NOS
 M8033/3 Pseudosarcomatous carcinoma
 Sarcomatoid carcinoma
 M8034/3 Polygonal cell carcinoma
 M8035/3 Carcinoma with osteoclast-like giant cells
 M8040/0 Tumorlet, benign
 M8040/1 Tumorlet, NOS
 M8041/3 Small cell carcinoma, NOS
 Reserve cell carcinoma
 Round cell carcinoma
 Small cell neuroendocrine carcinoma
 M8042/3 Oat cell carcinoma (C34._)
 M8043/3 Small cell carcinoma, fusiform cell
 M8044/3 Small cell carcinoma, intermediate cell
 M8045/3 Combined small cell carcinoma
 Mixed small cell carcinoma
 Combined small cell-large cell carcinoma
 Combined small cell-adenocarcinoma
 Combined small cell-squamous cell carcinoma
 M8046/3 Non-small cell carcinoma (C34._)

805–808 Squamous Cell Neoplasms 
 M8050/0 Papilloma, NOS (except papilloma of bladder M8120/1)
 M8050/2 Papillary carcinoma in situ
 M8050/3 Papillary carcinoma, NOS
 M8051/0 Verrucous papilloma
 M8051/3 Verrucous carcinoma, NOS
 Condylomatous carcinoma
 Verrucous squamous cell carcinoma
 Verrucous epidermoid carcinoma
 Warty carcinoma
 M8052/0 Squamous cell papilloma, NOS
 Squamous papilloma
 Keratotic papilloma
 M8052/2 Papillary squamous cell carcinoma, non-invasive
 Papillary squamous cell carcinoma in situ
 M8052/3 Papillary squamous cell carcinoma
 Papillary epidermoid carcinoma
 M8053/0 Squamous cell papilloma, inverted
 M8060/0 Squamous papillomatosis
 Papillomatosis, NOS
 M8070/2 Squamous cell carcinoma in situ, NOS
 Epidermoid carcinoma in situ, NOS
 Intraepidermal carcinoma, NOS
 Intraepithelial squamous cell carcinoma
 M8070/3 Squamous cell carcinoma, NOS
 Epidermoid carcinoma, NOS
 Squamous carcinoma
 Squamous cell epithelioma
 M8070/6 Squamous cell carcinoma, metastatic, NOS
 M8071/3 Squamous cell carcinoma, keratinizing, NOS
 Squamous cell carcinoma, large cell, keratinizing
 Epidermoid carcinoma, keratinizing
 M8072/3 Squamous cell carcinoma, large cell, nonkeratinizing, NOS
 Squamous cell carcinoma, non keratinizing, NOS
 Epidermoid carcinoma, large cell, nonkeratinizing
 M8073/3 Squamous cell carcinoma, small cell, nonkeratinizing
 Epidermoid carcinoma, small cell, nonkeratinizing
 M8074/3 Squamous cell carcinoma, spindle cell
 Epidermoid carcinoma, spindle cell
 Squamous cell carcinoma, sarcomatoid
 M8075/3 Squamous cell carcinoma, adenoid
 Squamous cell carcinoma, pseudoglandular
 Squamous cell carcinoma, acantholytic
 M8076/2 Squamous cell carcinoma in situ with questionable stromal invasion
 Epidermoid carcinoma in situ with questionable stromal invasion
 M8076/3 Squamous cell carcinoma, microinvasive
 M8077/2 Squamous intraepithelial neoplasia, grade III
 Cervical intraepithelial neoplasia, grade III (C53._)
 CIN III, NOS (C53._)
 CIN III with severe dysplasia (C53._)
 Vaginal intraepithelial neoplasia, grade III (C52._)
 VAIN III (C52._)
 Vulvar intraepithelial neoplasia, grade III (C51._)
 VIN III (C51._)
 Anal intraepithelial neoplasia, grade III (C21.1)
 AIN III (C21.1)
 M8078/3 Squamous cell carcinoma with horn formation
 M8080/2 Queyrat erythroplasia (C60._)
 M8081/2 Bowen disease (C44._)
 Intraepidermal squamous cell carcinoma, Bowen type (C44._)
 M8082/3 Lymphoepithelial carcinoma
 Lymphoepithelioma
 Lymphoepithelioma-like carcinoma
 Schmincke tumor (C11._)
 M8083/3 Basaloid squamous cell carcinoma
 M8084/3 Squamous cell carcinoma, clear cell type

809–811 Basal cell Neoplasms 
 M8090/1 Basal cell tumor (C44._)
 (M8090/3) Basal cell carcinoma, NOS (C44._)
 Basal cell epithelioma
 Rodent ulcer
 Pigmented basal cell carcinoma
 M8091/3 Multifocal superficial basal cell carcinoma (C44._)
 Multicentric basal cell carcinoma
 M8092/3 Infriltrating basal cell carcinoma, NOS (C44._)
 Infiltrating basal cell carcinoma, non-sclerosing
 Infiltrating basal cell carcinoma, sclerosing
 Basal cell carcinoma, morphoeic
 Basal cell carcinoma, desmoplastic type
 M8093/3 Basal cell carcinoma, fibroepithelial (C44._)
 Fibroepithelioma of Pinkus type
 Fibroepithelial basal cell carcinoma, Pinkus type
 Pinkus tumor
 Fibroepithelioma, NOS
 M8094/3 Basosquamous carcinoma (C44._)
 Mixed basal-squamous cell carcinoma
 M8095/3 Metatypical carcinoma
 M8096/0 Intraepidermal epithelioma of Jadassohn (C44._)
 M8097/3 Basal cell carcinoma, nodular (C44._)
 Basal cell carcinoma, micronodular
 M8098/3 Adenoid basal carcinoma (C53._)
 M8100/0 Trichoepithelioma (C44._)
 Brooke tumor
 Epithelioma adenoides cysticum
 M8101/0 Trichofolliculoma (C44._)
 M8102/0 Trichilemmoma (C44._)
 M8102/3 Trichilemmocarcinoma (C44._)
 Trichilemmal carcinoma
 M8103/0 Pilar tumor (C44._)
 Proliferating trichilemmal cyst
 Proliferating trichilemmal tumor
 M8110/0 Pilomatrixoma, NOS (C44._)
 Calcifying epithelioma of Malherbe
 Pilomatricoma, NOS
 M8110/3 Pilomatrix carcinoma (C44._)
 Pilomatrixoma, malignant
 Pilomatricoma, malignant
 Matrical carcinoma

812–813 Transitional cell Papillomas And Carcinomas 
 M8120/0 Transitional cell papilloma, benign
 Transitional papilloma
 M8120/1 Urothelial papilloma, NOS
 Papilloma of bladder (C67._)
 Transitional cell papilloma, NOS
 M8120/2 Transitional cell carcinoma in situ
 Urothelial carcinoma in situ
 M8120/3 Transitional cell carcinoma, NOS
 Urothelial carcinoma, NOS
 Transitional carcinoma
 M8121/0 Schneiderian papilloma, NOS (C30.0, C31._)
 Sinonasal papilloma, NOS
 Sinonasal papilloma, exophytic
 Sinonasal papilloma, fungiform
 Transitional cell papilloma, inverted, benign
 Transitional papilloma, inverted, benign
 M8121/1 Transitional cell papilloma, inverted, NOS
 Transitional papilloma, inverted, NOS
 Schneiderian papilloma, inverted
 Columnar cell papilloma
 Cylindrical cell papilloma
 Oncocytic Schneiderian papilloma
 M8121/3 Schneiderian carcinoma (C30.0, C31._)
 Cylindrical cell carcinoma
 M8122/3 Transitional cell carcinoma, spindle cell
 Transitional cell carcinoma, sarcomatoid
 M8123/3 Basaloid carcinoma
 M8124/3 Cloacogenic carcinoma (C21.2)
 M8130/1 Papillary transitional cell neoplasm of low malignant potential (C67._)
 Papillary urothelial neoplasm of low malignant potential
 M8130/2 Papillary transitional cell carcinoma, non-invasive (C67._)
 Papillary urothelial carcinoma, non-invasive
 M8130/3 Papillary transitional cell carcinoma (C67._)
 Papillary urothelial carcinoma
 M8131/3 Transitional cell carcinoma, micropapillary ( C67._)

814–838 Adenomas And Adenocarcinomas 
 (M8140/0) Adenoma, NOS
 M8140/1 Atypical adenoma
 Bronchial adenoma, NOS (C34._)
 M8140/2 Adenocarcinoma in situ, NOS
 (M8140/3) Adenocarcinoma, NOS
 M8140/6 Adenocarcinoma, metastatic, NOS
 M8141/3 Scirrhous adenocarcinoma
 Scirrhous carcinoma
 Carcinoma with productive fibrosis
 (M8142/3) Linitis plastica (C16._)
 M8143/3 Superficial spreading adenocarcinoma
 M8144/3 Adenocarcinoma, intestinal type (C16._)
 Carcinoma, intestinal type
 M8145/3 Carcinoma, diffuse type (C16._)
 Adenocarcinoma, diffuse type
 M8146/0 Monomorphic adenoma
 M8147/0 Basal cell adenoma
 M8147/3 Basal cell adenocarcinoma
 M8148/2 Glandular intraepithelial neoplasia, grade III
 Prostatic intraepithelial neoplasia, grade III (C61.9)
 PIN III
 M8149/0 Canalicular adenoma
 M8150/0 Islet cell adenoma (C25._)
 Islet cell tumor, benign
 Nesidioblastoma
 Islet cell adenomatosis
 M8150/1 Islet cell tumor, NOS (C25._)
 M8150/3 Islet cell carcinoma (C25._)
 Islet cell adenocarcinoma
 (M8151/0) Insulinoma, NOS (C25._)
 Beta cell adenoma
 M8151/3 Insulinoma, malignant (C25._)
 Beta cell tumor, malignant
 (M8152/0) Glucagonoma, NOS (C25._)
 Alpha cell tumor, NOS
 M8152/3 Glucagonoma, malignant (C25._)
 Alpha cell tumor, malignant
 (M8153/1) Gastrinoma, NOS
 G cell tumor, NOS
 Gastrin cell tumor
 M8153/3 Gastinoma, malignant
 G cell tumor, malignant
 Gastrin cell tumor, malignant
 M8154/3 Mixed islet cell and exocrine adenocarcinoma (C25._)
 Mixed acinar-endocrine carcinoma
 Mixed ductal-endocrine carcinoma
 M8155/1 Vipoma, NOS
 (M8155/3) Vipoma, malignant
 M8156/1 Somatostatinoma, NOS
 Somatostatin cell tumor, NOS
 M8156/3 Somatostatinoma, malignant
 somatostatin cell tumor, malignant
 M8157/1 Enteroglucagonoma, NOS
 M8157/3 Enteroglucagonoma, malignant
 M8160/0 Bile duct adenoma (C22.1, C24.0)
 Cholangioma
 (M8160/3) Cholangiocarcinoma (C22.1, C24.0)
 Bile duct carcinoma
 Bile duct adenocarcinoma
 M8161/0 (C22.1, C24.0)
 M8161/3 Bile duct cystadenocarcinoma (C22.1, C24.0)
 M8162/3 Klatskin tumor (C22.1, C24.0)
 M8170/0 Liver cell adenoma (C22.0)
 (M8170/3) Hepatocellular carcinoma, NOS (C22.0)
 Liver cell carcinoma
 Hepatocarcinoma
 Hepatoma, malignant
 Hepatoma, NOS
 M8171/3 Hepatocellular carcinoma, fibrolamellar (C22.0)
 M8172/3 Hepatocellular carcinoma, scirrhous (C22.0)
 Sclerosing hepatic carcinoma
 M8173/3 Hepatocellular carcinoma, spindle cell variant (C22.0)
 Hepatocellular carcinoma, sarcomatoid
 M8174/3 Hepatocellular carcinoma, clear cell type (C22.0)
 M8175/3 Hepatocellular carcinoma, pleomorphic type
 M8180/3 Combined hepatocellular carcinoma and cholangiocarcinoma (C22.0)
 Mixed hepatocellular and bilde duct carcinoma
 Hepatocholangiocarcinoma
 M8190/0 Trabecular adenoma
 M8190/3 Trabecular adenocarcinoma
 Trabecular carcinoma
 M8191/0 Embryonal adenoma
 M8200/0 Eccrine dermal cylindroma (C44._)
 Turban tumor
 Cylindroma of skin
 (M8200/3) Adenoid cystic carcinoma
 Adenocystic carcinoma
 Cylindroma, NOS (except cylindroma of skin M8200/0)
 Adenocarcinoma, cylindroid
 Bronchial adenoma, cylindroid (C34._)
 M8201/2 Cribiform carcinoma in situ (C50._)
 Ductal carcinoma in situ, cribiform type
 M8201/3 Cribiform carcinoma, NOS
 Ductal carcinoma, cribiform type
 M8202/0 Microcystic adenoma (C25._)
 M8204/0 Lactating adenoma
 M8210/0 Adenomatous polyp, NOS
 Polypoid adenoma
 M8210/2 Adenocarcinoma in situ in adenomatous polyp
 Adenocarcinoma in situ in tubular adenoma
 Carcinoma in situ in adenomatous polyp
 Adenocarcinoma in situ in polypoid adenoma
 Adenocarcinoma in situ in a polyp, NOS
 Carcinoma in situ in a polyp, NOS
 M8210/3 Adenocarcinoma in adenomatous polyp
 Adenocarcinoma in tubular adenoma
 Carcinoma in adenomatous polyp
 Adenocarcinoma in polypoid adenoma
 Adenocarcinoma in a polyp, NOS
 Carcinoma in a polyp, NOS
 M8211/0 Tubular adenoma, NOS
 M8211/3 Tubular adenocarcinoma
 Tubular carcinoma
 M8212/0 Flat adenoma
 M8213/0 Serrated adenoma (C18._)
 Mixed adenomatous and hyperplastic polyp
 M8214/3 Parietal cell carcinoma (C16._)
 Parietal cell adenocarcinoma
 M8215/3 Adenocarcinoma of anal glands (C21.1)
 Adenocarcinoma of anal ducts
 M8220/0 Adenomatous polyposis coli (C18._)
 Familial polyposis coli
 Adenomatosis, NOS
 M8220/3 Adenocarcinoma in adenomatous polyposis
 M8221/0 Multiple adenomatous polyps
 M8221/3 Adenocarcinoma in multiple adenomatous polyps
 M8230/2 Ductal carcinoma in situ, solid type (C50._)
 Intraductal carcinoma, solid type
 M8230/3 Solid carcinoma, NOS
 Solid carcinoma with mucin formation
 Solid adenocarcinoma with mucin formation
 M8231/3 Carcinoma simplex
 (M8240/1) Carcinoid tumor of uncertain malignant potential
 Carcinoid tumor, NOS, of appendix (C18.1)
 Carcinoid, NOS, of appendix
 Carcinoid tumor, argentaffin, NOS
 Argentaffinoma, NOS
 M8240/3 Carcinoid tumor, NOS (except of appendix M8240/1)
 Carcinoid, NOS (except of appendix)
 Typical carcinoid
 Bronchial adenoma, carcinoid
 M8241/3 Enterochromaffin cell carcinoid
 Carcinoid tumor, argentaffin, malignant
 Argentaffinoma, malignant
 EC cell carcinoid
 Serotonin producing carcinoid
 M8242/1 Enterochromaffin-like cell carcinoid, NOS
 ECL cell carcinoid, NOS
 M8242/3 Enterochromaffin-like cell tumor, malignant
 ECL cell carcinoid, malignant
 M8243/3 Goblet cell carcinoid
 Mucocarcinoid tumor
 Mucinous carcinoid
 M8244/3 Composite carcinoid
 Combined carcinoid and adenocarcinoma
 Mixed carcinoid-adenocarcinoma
 M8245/1 Tubular carcinoid
 M8245/3 Adenocarcinoid tumor
 M8246/3 Neuroendocrine carcinoma, NOS
 M8247/3 Merkel cell carcinoma (C44._)
 Merkel cell tumor
 Primary cutaneous neuroendocrine carcinoma
 M8248/1 Apudoma
 M8249/3 Atypical carcinoid tumor
 M8250/1 Pulmonary adenomatosis (C34._)
 M8250/3 Bronchiolo-alveolar adenocarcinoma, NOS (C34._)
 Bronchiolo-alveolar carcinoma, NOS
 Bronchiolar adenocarcinoma
 Bronchiolar carcinoma
 Alveolar cell carcinoma
 M8251/0 Alveolar adenoma (C34._)
 M8251/3 Alveolar adenocarcinoma (C34._)
 Alveolar carcinoma
 M8252/3 Bronchiolo-alveolar carcinoma, non-mucinous (C34._)
 Bronchiolo-alveolar carcinoma, Club cell
 Bronchiolo-alveolar carcinoma, type II pneumocyte
 M8253/3 Bronchiolo-alveolar carcinoma, mucinous (C32._)
 Bronchiolo-alveolar carcinoma, goblet cell type
 M8254/3 Bronchiolo-alveolar carcinoma, mixed mucinous and non-mucinous (C34._)
 Bronchiolo-alveolar carcinoma, Club cell and goblet cell type
 Bronchiolo-alveolar carcinoma, type II pneumocyte and goblet cell type
 Bronchiolo-alveolar carcinoma, indeterminate type
 M8255/3 Adenocarcinoma combined with mixed subtypes
 Adenomcarcinoma combined with other types of carcinoma
 M8260/0 Papillary adenoma, NOS
 Glandular papilloma
 M8260/3 Papillary adenocarcinoma, NOS
 Papillary carcinoma of thyroid (C73.9)
 Papillary renal cell carcinoma (C64.9)
 M8261/0 Villous adenoma, NOS
 Villous papilloma
 M8261/2 Adenocarcinoma in situ in villous adenoma
 M8261/3 Adenocarcinoma in villous adenoma
 M8262/3 Villous adenocarcinoma
 M8263/0 Tubulovillous adenoma, NOS
 villoglandular adenoma
 Papillotubular adenoma
 M8263/2 Adenocarcinoma in situ in tubulovillous adenoma
 M8263/3 Adenocarcinoma in tubulovillous adenoma
 Papillotubular adenocarcinoma
 Tubulopapillary adenocarcinoma
 M8264/0 Papillomatosis, glandular
 Biliary papillomatosis (C22.1, C24.0)
 M8270/0 Chromophobe adenoma (C75.1)
 M8270/3 Chromophobe carcinoma (C75.1)
 Chromophobe adenocarcinoma
 (M8271/0) Prolactinoma (C75.1)
 M8272/0 Pituitary adenoma, NOS (C75.1)
 M8272/3 Pituitary carcinoma, NOS (C75.1)
 M8280/0 Acidophil adenoma (C75.1)
 Eosinophil adenoma
 M8280/3 Acidophil carcinoma (C75.1)
 Acidophil adenocarcinoma
 Eosinophil carcinoma
 Eosinophil adenocarcinoma
 M8281/0 Mixed acidophil-basophil adenoma (C75.1)
 (M8290/0)  Oxyphilic adenoma
 Oncocytic adenoma
 Oncocytoma
 Hurthle cell adenoma (C73.9)
 Hurthle cell tumor
 Follicular adenoma, oxyphilic cell (C73.9)
 M8290/3 Oxyphilic adenocarcinoma
 Oncocytic carcinoma
 Oncocytic adenocarcinoma
 Hurthlecell carcinoma (C73.9)
 Hurthle cell adenocarcinoma
 Follicular carcinoma, oxyphilic cell (C73.9)
 M8300/0 Basophil adenoma (C75.1)
 Mucoid cell adenoma
 M8300/3 Basophil carcinoma (C75.1)
 Basophil adenocarcinoma
 Mucoid cell adenocarcinoma
 M8310/0 Clear cell adenoma
 M8310/3 Clear cell adenocarcinoma, NOS
 Clear cell carcinoma
 Clear cell adenocarcinoma, mesonephroid
 M8311/1 Hypernephroid tumor
 (M8312/3) Renal cell carcinoma, NOS (C64.9)
 Renal cell adenocarcinoma
 Grawitz tumor
 Hypernephroma
 M8313/0 Clear cell adenofibroma (C56.9)
 clear cell cystadenofibroma
 M8313/1 Clear cell adenofibroma of borderline malignancy
 Clear cell cystadenofibroma of borderline malignancy
 M8313/3 Clear cell adenocarcinofibroma (C56.9)
 Clear cell cystadenocarcinofibroma
 M8314/3 Lipid-rich carcinoma (C50._)
 M8315/3 Glycogen-rich carcinoma
 M8316/3 Cyst-associated renal cell carcinoma (C64.9)
 M8317/3 Renal cell carcinoma, chromophobe type (C64.9)
 Chromophobe cell renal carcinoma
 M8318/3 Renal cell carcinoma, sarcomatoid (C64.9)
 Renal cell carcinoma, spindle cell
 M8319/3 collecting duct carcinoma (C64.9)
 Bellini duct carcinoma
 Renal carcinoma, collecting duct type
 M8320/3 Granular cell carcinoma
 Granular cell adenocarcinoma
 M8321/0 Chief cell adenoma (C75.0)
 M8322/0 Water-clear cell adenoma (C75.0)
 M8322/3 Water-clear cell adenocarcinoma (C75.0)
 Water-celar cell carcinoma
 M8323/0 Mixed cell adenoma
 M8323/3 Mixed cell adenocarcinoma
 M8324/0 Lipoadenoma
 Adenolipoma
 M8325/0 Metanephric adenoma (C64.9)
 M8330/0 Follicular adenoma (C73.9)
 M8330/1 Atypical follicular adenoma (C73.9)
 M8330/3 Follicular adenocarcinoma, NOS (C73.9)
 Follicular carcinoma, NOS
 M8331/3 Follicular adenocarcinoma, well differentiated (C73.9)
 Follicular carcinoma, well differentiated
 M8332/3 Follicular adenocarcinoma, trabecular (C73.9)
 Follicular carcinoma, trabecular
 Follicular adenocarcinoma, moderately differentiated
 FOlloicular carcinoma, moderately differentiated
 M8333/0 Microfollicular adenoma, NOS (C73.9)
 Fetal adenoma
 M8333/3 Fetal adenocarcinoma
 M8334/0 Macrofollicular adenoma (C73.9)
 Colloid adenoma
 M8335/3 Follicular carcinoma, minimally invasive (C73.9)
 Follicular carcinoma, encapsulated
 M8336/0 Hyalinizing trabecular adenoma (C73.9)
 (M8337/3)Insular carcinoma (C73.9)
 M8340/3 Papillary carcinoma, follicular variant (C73.9)
 Papillary adenocarcinoma, follicular variant
 Papillary and follicular adenocarcinoma
 Papillary and follicular carcinoma
 M8341/3 Papillary microcarcinoma (C73.9)
 M8342/3 Papillary carcinoma, oxyphilic cell (C73.9)
 M8343/3 Papillary carcinoma, encapsulated (C73.9)
 M8344/3 Papillary carcinoma, columnar cell (C73.9)
 Papillary carcinoma, tall cell
 M8345/3 Medullary carcinoma with amyloid stroma (C73.9)
 Parafollicular cell carcinoma
 C cell carcinoma
 M8346/3 Mixed medullary-follicular carcinoma (C73.9)
 M8347/3 Mixed medullary-papillary carcinoma (C73.9)
 M8350/3 Nonencapsulated sclerosing carcinoma (C73.9)
 Nonencapsulated sclerosing adenocarcinoma
 Nonencapsulated sclerosing tumor
 Papillary carcinoma, diffuse sclerosing
 M8360/1 Multiple endocrine adenomas
 Endocrine adenomatosis
 M8361/0 Juxtaglomerular tumor (C64.9)
 Reninoma
 M8370/0 Adrenal cortical adenoma, NOS (C74.0)
 Adrenal cortical tumor, benign
 Adrenal cortical tumor, NOS
 M8370/3 Adrenal cortical carcinoma (C74.0)
 Adrenal cortical adenocarcinoma
 Adrenal cortical tumor, malignant
 M8371/0 Adrenal cortical adenoma, compact cell (C74.0)
 M8372/0 Adrenal cortical adenoma, pigmented (C74.0)
 Black adenoma
 Pigmented adenoma
 M8373/0 Adrenal cortical adenoma, clear cell (C74.0)
 M8374/0 Adrenal cortical adenoma, glomerulosa cell (C74.0)
 M8375/0 Adrenal cortical adenoma, mixed cell (C74.0)
 (M8380/0) Endometrioid adenoma, NOS
 Endometrioid cystadenoma, NOS
 M8380/1 Endometrioid adenoma, borderline malignancy
 Endometrioid cystadenoma, borderline malignancy
 Endometrioid tumor of low malignant potential
 Atypical proliferative endometrioid tumor
 M8380/3 Endometrioid adenocarcinoma, NOS
 Endometrioid carcinoma, NOS
 Endometrioid cystadenocarcinoma
 M8381/0 Endometrioid adenofibroma, NOS
 Endometrioid cystadenofibroma, NOS
 M8381/1 Endometrioid adenofibroma, borderline malignancy
 Endometrioid cystadenofibroma, borderline malignancy
 M8381/3 Endometriod adenofibroma, malignant
 Endometrioid cystadenofibroma, malignant
 M8382/3 Endometrioid adenocarcinoma, secretory variant
 M8383/3 Endometrioid adenocarcinoma, ciliated cell variant
 M8384/3 Adenocarcinoma, endocervical type

839–842 Adnexal And Skin appendage Neoplasms 
M8390/0 Skin appendage adenoma (C44._)
 Skin appendage tumor, benign
 Adnexal tumor, benign

M8390/3 Skin appendage carcinoma (C44._)
 Adnexal carcinoma

M8391/0 Follicular fibroma (C44._)
 Trichodiscoma
 Fibrofolliculoma
 Perifollicular fibroma

M8392/0 Syringofibroadenoma (C44._)

M8400/0 Sweat gland adenoma (C44._)
 Sweat gland tumor, benign
 Hidradenoma, NOS
 Syringadenoma, NOS

M8400/1 Sweat gland tumor, NOS (C44._)

M8400/3 Sweat gland adenocarcinoma (C44._)
 Sweat gland carcinoma
 Sweat gland tumor, malignant

M8401/0 Apocrine adenoma
 Apocrine cystadenoma

M8401/3 Apocrine adenocarcinoma

M8402/0 Nodular hidradenoma (C44._)
 Eccrine acrospiroma
 Clear cell hidradenoma

M8402/3 Nodular hidradenoma, malignant (C44._)
 Hidradenocarcinoma

M8403/0 Eccrine spiradenoma (C44._)
 Spiradenoma, NOS

M8403/3 Malignant eccrine spiradenoma (C44._)
M8404/0 Hidrocystoma (C44._)
 Eccrine cystadenoma

M8405/0 Papillary hidradenoma
Hidradenoma papilliferum

M8406/0 Papillary syringadenoma (C44._)
 Papillary syringocystadenoma
 Syringocystadenoma papilliferum

M8407/0 Syringoma, NOS (C44._)

M8407/3 Sclerosing sweat duct carcinoma (C44._)
 Syringomatous carcinoma
 Microcystic adnexal carcinoma

M8408/0 Eccrine papillary adenoma (C44._)

M8408/1 Aggressive digital papillary adenoma (C44._)

M8408/3 Eccrine papillary adenocarcinoma (C44._)
 Digital papillary adenocarcinoma

M8409/0 Eccrine poroma (C44._)

M8410/0 Sebaceous adenoma (C44._)

M8410/3 Sebaceous adenocarcinoma (C44._)
 Sebaceous carcinoma

M8413/3 Eccrine adenocarcinoma (C44._)

M8420/0 Ceruminous adenoma (C44.2)

M8420/3 Ceruminous adenocarcinioma (C44.2)
Ceruminous carcinoma

843 Mucoepidermoid Neoplasms 
M8430/1 Mucoepidermoid tumor

M8430/3 Mucoepidermoid carcinoma

844–849 Cystic, Mucinous And Serous Neoplasms 
M8440/0 Cystadenoma, NOS
 Cystoma, NOS

M8440/3 Cystadenocarcinoma, NOS

M8441/0 Serous cystadenoma, NOS
 Serous cystoma
 Serous microcystic adenoma

M8441/3 Serous cystadenocarcinoma, NOS (C56.9)
 Serous adenocarcinoma, NOS
 Serous carcinoma, NOS

M8442/1 Serous cystadenoma, borderline malignancy (C56.9)
 Serous tumor, NOS, of low malignant potential
 Atypical proliferating serous tumor

M8443/0 Clear cell cystadenoma (C56.9)

M8444/1 Clear cell cystic tumor of borderline malignancy (C56.9)
 Atypical proliferating clear cell tumor

M8450/0 Papillary cystadenoma, NOS (C56.9)

M8450/3 Papillary cystadenocarcinoma, NOS (C56.9)
 Papillocystic adenocarcinoma

M8451/1 Papillary cystadenoma, borderline malignancy (C56.9)

M8452/1 Solid pseudo papillary tumor (C25._)
 Papillary cystic tumor
 Solid and papillary epithelial neoplasm
 Solid and cystic tumor

M8452/3 Solid pseudopapillary carcinoma (C25._)

M8453/0 Intraductal papillary-mucinous adenoma (C25._)

M8453/1 Intraductal papillary-mucinous tumor with moderate dysplasia (C25._)

M8453/2 Intraductal papillary-mucinous carcinoma, non-invasive (C25._)

M8453/3 Intraductal papillary-mucinous carcinoma invasive (C25._)

M8454/0 Cystic tumor of atrio-ventricular node (C38.0)

M8460/0 Papillary serous cystadenoma, NOS (C56.9)

M8460/3 Papillary serous cystadenocarcinoma (C56.9)
 Papillary serous adenocarcinoma
 Micropapillary serous carcinoma

M8461/0 Serous surface papilloma (C56.9)

M8461/3 Serous surface papillary carcinoma (C56.9)
 Primary serous papillary carcinoma of peritoneum (C48.1)

M8462/1 Serous papillary cystic tumor of borderline malignancy (C56.9)
 Papillary serous cystadenoma, borderline malignancy
 Papillary serous tumor of low malignant potential
 Atypical proliferative papillary serous tumor

M8463/1 Serous surface papillary tumor of borderline malignancy (C56.9)

M8470/0 Mucinous cystadenoma, NOS (C56.9)
 Mucinous cystoma
 Pseudomucinous cystadenoma, NOS

M8470/1 Mucinous cystic tumor with moderate dysplasia (C25._)

M8470/2 Mucinous cystadenocarcinoma, non-invasive (C25._)

M8470/3 Mucinous cystadenocarcinoma/ NOS (C56.9)
 Pseudomucinous adenocarcinoma
 Pseudomucinous cystadenocarcinoma, NOS

M8471/0 Papillary mucinous cystadenoma, NOS (C56.9)
 Papillary pseudomucinous cystadenoma, NOS

M8471/3 papillary mucinous cystadenocarcinoma (C56.9)
 Papillary pseudomucinous cystadenocarcinoma

M8472/1 Mucinous cystic tumor of borderline malignancy (C56.9)
 Mucinous cystadenoma, borderline malignancy
 Pseudomucinous cystadenoma, borderline malignancy
 Mucinous tumor, NOS, of low malignant potential
 Atypical proliferative mucinous tumor

M8473/1 Papillary mucinous cystadenoma, borderline malignancy (C56.9)
 Papillary pseudomucinous cystadenoma borderline malignancy
 Papillary mucinous tumor of low malignant potential

M8480/0 Mucinous adenoma

M8480/3 Mucinous adenocarcinoma
 Mucinous carcinoma
 Colloid adenocarcinoma
 Colloid carcinoma
 Gelatinous adenocarcinoma
 Gelatinous carcinoma
 Mucoid adenocarcinoma
 Mucoid carcinoma
 Mucous adenocarcinoma
 Mucous carcinoma
 Pseudomyxoma peritonei with unknown primary site (C80.9)

M8480/6 Pseudomyxoma peritonei

M8481/3 Mucin-producing adenocarcinoma
 Mucin-producing carcinoma
 Mucin-secreting adenocarcinoma
 Mucin-secreting carcinoma

M8482/3 Mucinous adenocarcinoma, endocervical type

M8490/3 Signet ring cell carcinoma
 Signet ring cell adenocarcinoma

M8490/6 Metastatic signet ring cell carcinoma
 Krukenberg tumor

850–854 Ductal, Lobular And Medullary Neoplasms 
M8500/2 Intraductal carcinoma, noninfiltrating, NOS
 Intraductal adenocarcinoma, noninfiltrating, NOS
 Intraductal carcinoma, NOS
 Ductal carcinoma in situ, NOS (C50._)
 DCIS, NOS
 Ductal intraepithelial neoplasia 3
 DIN 3

M8500/3 Infiltrating duct carcinoma, NOS (C50._)
 Infiltrating duct adenocarcinoma
 Duct adenocarcinoma, NOS
 Duct carcinoma, NOS
 Duct cell carcinoma
 Ductal carcinoma, NOS

M8501/2 Comedocarcinoma, noninfiltrating (C50._)
 Ductal carcinoma in situ, comedo type
 DCIS, comedo type

M8501/3 Comedocarcinoma, NOS (C50._)

M8502/3 Secretory carcinoma of breast (C50._)
 Juvenile carcinoma of breast

M8503/0 Intraductal papilloma
 Duct adenoma, NOS
 Ductal papilloma

M8503/2 Noninfiltrating intraductal papillary adenocarcinoma (C50._)
 Noninfiltrating intraductal papillary carcinoma
 Intraductal papillary adenocarcinoma, NOS
 Intraductal papillary carcinoma, NOS
 Ductal carcinoma in situ, papillary
 DCIS, papillary

M8503/3 Intraductal papillary adenocarcinoma with invasion (C50._)
 Infiltrating papillary adenocarcinoma
 Infiltrating and papillary adenocarcinoma

M8504/0 Intracystic papillary adenoma
 Intracystic papilloma

M8504/2 Noninfiltrating intracystic carcinoma

M8504/3 Intracystic carcinoma, NOS
 Intracystic papillary adenocarcinoma

M8505/0 Intraductal papillomatosis, NOS
 Diffuse intraductal papillomatosis

M8506/0 Adenoma of nipple (C50._)
 Subareolar duct papillomatosis

M8507/2 Intraductal micropapillary carcinoma (C50._)
 Ductal carcinoma in situ, micropapillary
 Intraductal carcinoma, clinging

M8508/3 Cystic hypersecretory carcinoma (C50._)

M8510/3 Medullary carcinoma, NOS
 Medullary adenocarcinoma

M8512/3 Medullary carcinoma with lymphoid stroma

M8513/3 Atypical medullary carcinoma (C50._)

M8514/3 Duct carcinoma, desmoplastic type

M8520/2 Lobular carcinoma in situ, NOS (C50._)
 Lobular carcinoma, noninfiltrating
 LCIS, NOS

M8520/3 Lobular carcinoma, NOS (C50._)
 Lobular adenocarcinoma
 Infiltrating lobular carcinoma, NOS

M8521/3 Infiltrating ductular carcinoma (C50._)

M8522/2 Intraductal carcinoma and lobular carcinoma in situ (C50._)

M8522/3 Infiltrating duct and lobular carcinoma (C50._)
 Lobular and ductal carcinoma
 Infiltrating duct and lobular carcinoma in situ
 Intraductal and lobular carcinoma
 Infiltrating lobular carcinoma and ductal carcinoma in situ

M8523/3 Infiltrating duct mixed with other types of carcinoma (C50._)
 Infiltrating duct and cribiform carcinoma
 Infiltrating duct and mucinous carcinoma
 Infiltrating duct and tubular carcinoma
 Infiltrating duct and colloid carcinoma

M8524/3 Infiltrating lobular mixed with other types of carcinoma (C50._)

M8525/3 Polymorphous low grade adenocarcinoma
 Terminal duct adenocarcinoma

M8530/3 Inflammatory carcinoma (C50._)
 Inflammatory adenocarcinoma

M8540/3 Paget disease, mammary (C50._)
 Paget disease of breast

M8541/3 Paget disease and infiltrating duct carcinoma of breast (C50._)

M8542/3 Paget disease, extramammary (except Paget disease of bone)

M8543/3 Paget disease and intraductal carcinoma of breast (C50._)

8550 Acinar cell neoplasms 
M8550/0 Acinar cell adenoma
 Acinar adenoma
 Acinic cell adenoma

M8550/1 Acinar cell tumor
 Acinic cell tumor

M8550/3 Acinar cell carcinoma
 Acinic cell adenocarcinoma
 Acinar adenocarcinoma
 Acinar carcinoma

M8551/3 Acinar cell cystadenocarcinoma

856–857 Complex epithelial neoplasms 
M8560/0 Mixed squamous cell and glandular papilloma

M8560/3 Adenosquamous carcinoma
 Mixed adenocarcinoma and squamous cell carcinoma
 Mixed adenocarcinoma and epidermoid carcinoma

M8561/0 Adenolymphoma (C07._, C08._)
 Warthin's tumor
 Papillary cystadenoma lymphomatosum

M8562/3 Epithelial-myoepithelial carcinoma

M8570/3 Adenocarcinoma with squamous metaplasia
 Adenoacanthoma

M8571/3 Adenocarcinoma with cartilaginous and osseous metaplasia
 Adenocarcinoma with cartilaginous metaplasia
 Adenocarcinoma with osseous metaplasia

M8572/3 Adenocarcinoma with spindle cell metaplasia

M8573/3 Adenocarcinoma with apocrine metaplasia
 Carcinoma with apocrine metaplasia

M8574/3 Adenocarcinoma with neuroendocrine differentiation
 Carcinoma with neuroendocrine differentiation

M8575/3 Metaplastic carcinoma, NOS

M8576/3 Hepatoid adenocarcinoma
 Hepatoid carcinoma

858 Thymic Epithelial Neoplasms 
 M8580/0 Thymoma, benign (C37.9)
 M8580/1 Thymoma, NOS (C37.9)
 M8580/3 Thymoma, malignant, NOS (C37.9)
 M8581/1 Thymoma, type A, NOS (C37.9)
 Thymoma, spindle cell, NOS
 Thymoma, medullary, NOS

M8581/3 Thymoma, type A, malignant (C37.9)
 Thymoma, spindle cell, malignant
 Thymoma, medullary, malignant

M8582/1 Thymoma, type AB, NOS (C37.9)
 Thymoma, mixed type, NOS

M8582/3 thymoma, type AB, malignant (C37.9)
 Thymoma, mixed type, malignant

M8583/1 Thymoma, type B1, NOS (C37.9)
 Thymoma, lymphocyte-rich, NOS
 Thymoma, lymphocytic, NOS
 Thymoma, predominantly cortical, NOS
 Thymoma, organoid, NOS

M8583/3 Thymoma, type B1, malignant (C37.9)
 Thymoma, lymphocyte-rich, malignant
 Thymoma, lymphocytic, malignant
 Thymoma, predominantly cortical, malignant
 Thymoma, organoid, malignant

M8584/1 Thymoma, type B2, NOS (C37.9)
 Thymoma, cortical, NOS

M8584/3 Thymoma, type B2, malignant (C37.9)
 Thymoma, cortical, malignant

M8585/1 Thymoma, type B3, NOS (C37.9)
 Thymoma, epithelial, NOS
 Thymoma, atypical, NOS

M8585/3 Thymoma, type B3, malignant (C37.9)
 Thymoma, epithelial, malignant
 Thymoma, atypical, malignant
 Well differentiated thymic carcinoma

M8586/3 Thymic carcinoma, NOS (C37.9)
 Thymoma, type C

M8587/0 Ectopic hamartomatous thymoma

M8588/3 Spindle epithelial tumor with thymus-like element
 Spindle epithelial tumor with thymus-like differentiation
 SETTLE

M8589/3 Carcinoma showing thymus-like element
 Carcinoma showing thymus-like differentiation
 CASTLE

859–867 Specialized gonadal neoplasms 
M8590/1 Sex cord-stromal tumor, NOS
 Sex cord/gonadal stromal tumor, NOS
 Testicular/ovarian stromal tumor

M8591/1 Sex cord-gonadal stromal tumor, incompletely differentiated

M8592/1 Sex cord-gonadal stromal tumor, mixed forms

M8593/1 Stromal tumor with minor sex cord elements

M8600/0 Thecoma, NOS
 Theca cell tumor

M8600/3 Thecoma, malignant

M8601/0 Thecoma, luteinized

M8602/0 Sclerosing stromal tumor

M8610/0 Luteoma, NOS
Luteinoma

M8620/1 Granulosa cell tumor, NOS
 adult type

M8620/3 Granulosa cell tumor, malignant
 Granulosa cell carcinoma
 Granulosa cell tumor, sarcomatoid

M8621/1 Granulosa cell-theca cell tumor
 Theca cell-granulosa cell tumor

M8622/1 Granulosa cell tumor, juvenile

M8623/1 Sex cord tumor with annular tubules

M8630/1 Androblastoma/Arrhenoblastoma, benign

M8630/1 Androblastoma/Arrhenoblastoma, NOS

M8630/3 Androblastoma/Arrhenoblastoma, malignant

M8631/0 Sertoli-Leydig cell tumor, well differentiated

M8631/1 Sertoli-Leydig cell tumor of intermediate differentiation
 Sertoli-Leydig cell tumor, NOS

M8631/3 Sertoli-Leydig cell tumor, poorly differentiated
 Sertoli-Leydig cell tumor, sarcomatoid

M8632/1 Gynandroblastoma

M8633/1 Sertoli-Leydig cell tumor, retiform

M8634/1 Sertoli-Leydig cell tumor, intermediate differentiation, with heterologous elements
 retiform, with heterologous elements

M8634/3 Sertoli-Leydig cell tumor, poorly differentiated, with heterologous elements

M8640/1 Sertoli tumor, NOS
 Pick tubular adenoma
 Sertoli cell adenoma
 Tubular androblastoma, NOS
 Testicular adenoma

M8640/3 Sertoli cell carcinoma (C62._)

M8641/0 Sertoli cell tumor with lipid storage
 Folliculome lipidique (C56.9)
 Tubular androblastoma with lipid storage
 Lipid-rich Sertoli cell tumor

M8642/1 large cell calcifying Sertoli cell tumor

M8650/0 Leydig cell tumor, benign (C62._)

M8650/3 Leydig cell tumor, malignant
 Interstitial cell tumor, malignant

M8660/0 Hilus cell tumor (C56.9)
 Hilar cell tumor

M8670/0 Lipid cell tumor of ovary (C56.9)
 Lipoid cell tumor of ovary
 Steroid cell tumor, NOS
 Masculinovoblastoma

M8670/3 Steroid cell tumor, malignant

M8641/0 Adrenal rest tumor

868–871 Paragangliomas And Glomus tumors 
M8680/0 Paraganglioma, benign

M8680/1 Paraganglioma, NOS

M8680/3 paraganglioma, malignant

M8681/1 Sympathetic paraganglioma

M8682/1 Parasympathetic paraganglioma

M8683/0 Gangliocytic paraganglioma (C17.0)

M8690/1 Glomus jugulare tumor, NOS (C75.5)
 Jugular/jugulotympanic paranglioma

M8691/1 Aortic body tumor (C75.5)
 Aortic/aorticopulmonary paraganglioma

M8692/1 Carotid body tumor/paraganglioma (C75.4)

M8693/1 Extra-adrenal paraganglioma, NOS
 Nonchromaffin paraganglioma, NOS
 Chemodectoma

M8693/3 Extra-adrenal paraganglioma, malignant
 Nonchromaffin paraganglioma, malignant

M8700/0 Pheochromocytoma, NOS (C74.1)
 Adrenal medullary/chromaffin paraganglioma
 Chromaffin tumor
 Chromaffinoma

M8700/3 Pheochromocytoma, malignant (C74.1)
 Adrenal medullary paraganglioma, malignant
 Pheochromoblastoma

M8710/3 Glomangiosarcoma
 Glomoid sarcoma

M8711/0 Glomus tumor, NOS

M8711/3 Glomus tumor, Malignant

M8712/0 Glomangioma

M8713/0 Glomangiomyoma

872–879 Nevi And Melanomas 
M8720/0 Pigmented nevus, NOS
 Melanocytic nevus
 Nevus, NOS
 Hairy nevus

M8720/2 Melanoma in situ

M8720/3 Malignant melanoma, NOS (except juvenile melanoma M8770/0)
 Melanoma, NOS

M8721/3 Nodular melanoma

M8722/0 Balloon cell nevus

M8722/3 Balloon cell melanoma

M8723/0 Halo nevus
 Regressing nevus

M8723/3 Malignant melanoma, regressing

M8725/0 Neuronevus

M8726/0 Magnocellular nevus (C69.4)
 Melanocytoma, eyeball
Melanocytoma, NOS

M8727/0 Dysplastic nevus

M8727/0 dysplastic nevus

M8728/0 Diffuse melanocytosis

M8728/1 Meningeal melanocytoma (C70.9)

M8728/3 Meningeal melanomatosis (C70.9)

M8730/0 Nonpigmented nevus
 Achromic nevus

M8740/0 Junctional nevus, NOS
 Intraepidermal nevus

M8740/3 Malignant melanoma in junctional nevus

M8741/2 Precancerous melanosis, NOS

M8741/3 Malignant melanoma in precancerous melanosis

M8742/3 Lentigo maligna melanoma
 Hutchinson melanotic freckle

M8743/3 Superficial spreading melanoma

M8744/3 Acral lentiginous melanoma, malignant

M8745/3 * Desmoplastic melanoma, malignant
 Neurotropic melanoma, malignant
 Melanoma, desmoplastic, amelanotic

M8746/3 Mucosal lentiginous melanoma

M8750/0 Intradermal nevus
 Dermal nevus

M8760/0 compound nevus
 Dermal and epidermal nevus

M8761/0 Small congenital nevus

M8761/1 Giant pigmented nevus, NOS
 Intermediate and giant congenital nevus

M8761/3 Malignant melanoma in giant pigmented nevus/congenital melanocytic nevus

M78762/1 Proliferative dermal lesion in congenital nevus

M8770/0 Epithelioid and spindle cell nevus
 Juvenile nevus
 Juvenile melanoma
 Spitz nevus
 Pigmented spindle cell nevus of Reed

M8770/3 Mixed epithelioid and spindle cell melanoma

M8771/0 Epithelioid cell nevus

M8771/3 Epithelioid cell melanoma

M8772/0 spindle cell nevus, NOS

M8772/3 Spindle cell melanoma, NOS

M8773/3 Spindle cell melanoma, type A

M8774/3 Spindle cell melanoma, type B

M8780/0 Blue nevus, NOS
 Jadassohn blue nevus

M8780/3 blue nevus, malignant

M8790/0 Cellular blue nevus

880 Soft tissue Tumors And Sarcomas, NOS 
M8800/0 Soft tissue tumor, benign

M8800/3 Sarcoma, NOS
 Soft tissue sarcoma
 Soft tissue/mesenchymal tumor, malignant

M8800/9 Sarcomatosis, NOS

M8801/3 Spindle cell sarcoma

M8802/3 Giant cell sarcoma (except of bone M9250/3)
Pleomorphic cell sarcoma

M8803/3 Small cell sarcoma
 Round cell sarcoma

M8804/3 Epithelioid sarcoma
 Epithelioid cell sarcoma

M8805/3 Undifferentiated sarcoma

M8806/3 Desmoplastic small round cell tumor

881–883 Fibromatous neoplasms 
M8810/0 Fibroma, NOS

M8810/1 Cellular fibroma (C56.9)

M8810/3 Fibrosarcoma, NOS

M8811/0 Fibromyxoma
 Myxoid fibroma
 Myxofibroma, nos

M8811/3 Fibromyxosarcoma

M8812/0 Periosteal fibroma (C40._, C41._)
 Periosteal sarcoma, NOS

M8813/0 Fascial fibroma

M8813/3 Fascial fibrosarcoma

M8814/3 Infantile fibrosarcoma
 Congenital fibrosarcoma

M8815/0 Solitary fibrous tumor
 Localized fibrous tumor

M8815/3 Solitary fibrous tumor, malignant

M8820/0 Elastofibroma

M8821/1 Aggressive fibromatosis
Extra-abdominal desmoid
 Desmoid, NOS
 Invasive fibroma

M8822/1 Abdominal fibromatosis
 Abdominal desmoid
 Mesenteric fibromatosis (C48.1)
 Retroperitoneal fibromatosis (C48.0)

M8823/0 Desmoplastic fibroma

M8824/0 Myofibroma

M8824/1 Myofibromatosis
 Congenital generalized fibromatosis
 Infantile myofibromatosis

M8825/0 Myofibroblastoma

M8825/1 Myofibroblastic tumor, nos
 Inflammatory myofibroblastic tumor

M8826/0 Angiomyofibroblastoma

M8827/1 Myobfibroblastic tumor, peribronchial (C34._)
 congenital peribronchial myofibroblastic tumor

M8830/0 Benign fibrous histiocytoma
 Fibrous histiocytoma, NOS
 Fibroxanthoma, NOS
 Xantofibroma

M8830/1 Atypical fibrous histiocytoma
 Atypical fibroxanthoma

M8830/3 Malignant fibrous histiocytoma
 Fibroxanthoma, malignant

M8831/0 Histiocytoma, NOS
 Deep histiocytoma
 Juvenile histiocytoma
 Reticulohistiocytoma

M8832/0 Dermatofibroma, NOS (C44._)
 Sclerosing hemangioma
 Cutaneous histiocytoma
 Subepidermal nodular fibrosis
 Dermatofibroma lenticulare

M8832/3 Dermatofibrosarcoma, NOS (C44._)
 Dermatofibrosarcoma protuberans, NOS

M8833/3 Pigmented dermatofibrosarcoma protuberans
 Bednar tumor

M8834/1 Giant-cell fibroblastoma

M8835/1 Plexiform fibrohistiocytic tumor

M8836/1 Angiomatoid fibrous histiocytoma

884 Myxomatous neoplasms 
M8840/0 Myxoma, NOS

M8840/3 Myxosarcoma

M8841/1 Angiomyxoma
 Aggressive angiomyxoma

M8842/0 Ossifying fibromyxoid tumor

885–888 Lipomatous neoplasms 
M8850/0 Lipoma, NOS

M8850/1 Atypical lipoma
 Superficial well differentiated liposarcoma
 Well differentiated liposarcoma of superficial soft tissue

M8850/3 Liposarcoma, NOS
 Fibroliposarcoma

M8851/0 Fibrolipoma

M8851/3 Liposarcoma, well differentiated
 Liposarcoma, differentiated
 Lipoma-like liposarcoma
 Sclerosing liposarcoma
 Inflammatory liposarcoma

M8852/0 Fibromyxolipoma
 Myxolipoma

M8852/3 Myxoid liposarcoma
 Myxoliposarcoma

M8853/3 Round cell liposarcoma

M8854/0 Pleomorphic lipoma

M8854/3 Pleomorphic liposarcoma

M8855/3 Mixed liposarcoma

M8856/0 Intramuscular lipoma
 Infiltrating lipoma/angiolipoma

M8857/0 Spindle cell lipoma

M8857/3 Fibroblastic liposarcoma

M8858/3 Dedifferentiated liposarcoma

M8860/0 Angiomyolipoma

M8861/0 Angiolipoma, NOS

M8862/0 Chondroid lipoma

M8870/0 Myelolipoma

M8880/0 Hibernoma
 Fetal fat cell lipoma
 Brown fat tumor

M8881/0 Lipoblastomatosis
 Fetal lipoma, NOS
 Fetal lipomatosis
 Lipoblastoma

889–892 Myomatous neoplasms 
M8890/0 Leiomyoma, NOS
 Fibroid uterus (C55.9)
 Fibromyoma
 Leiomyofibroma
 Plexiform leiomyoma
 Lipoleiomyoma

M8890/1 Leiomyomatosis, NOS
 Intravascular leiomyomatosis

M8890/3 Leiomyosarcoma, NOS

M8891/0 Epithelioid leiomyoma
 Leiomyoblastoma

M8891/3 Epithelioid leiomyosarcoma

M8892/0 Cellular leiomyoma

M8893/0 Bizarre leiomyoma
 Symplastic/atypical/pleomorphic leiomyoma

M8894/0 Angiomyoma
 Vascular leiomyoma
 Angioleiomyoma

M8894/3 Angiomyosarcoma

M8895/0 Myoma

M8895/3 Myosarcoma

M8896/3 Myxoid leiomyosarcoma

M8897/1 Smooth muscle tumor of uncertain malignant potential
 Smooth muscle tumor, NOS

M8898/1 Metastasizing leiomyoma

M8900/0 Rhabdomyoma, NOS

M8900/3 Rhabdomyosarcoma, NOS
 Rhabdosarcoma

M8901/3 Pleomorphic rhabdomyosarcoma, adult type
 Pleomorphic rhabdomyosarcoma, NOS

M8902/3 Mixed type rhabdomyosarcoma
 Mixed embryonal rhabdomyosarcoma and alveolar rhabdomyosarcoma

M8903/0 Fetal rhabdomyoma

M8904/0 Adult rhabdomyoma
 Glycogenic rhabdomyoma

M8905/0 Genital rhabdomyoma

M8910/3 Embryonal rhabdomyosarcoma, NOS
 Embryonal rhabdomyosarcoma, pleomorphic
 Sarcoma botryoides
 Botryoid sarcoma

M8912/3 Spindle cell rhabdomyosarcoma

M8920/3 Alveolar rhabdomyosarcoma

M8921/3 Rhabdomyosarcoma with ganglionic differentiation
 Ectomesenchymoma

893–899 Complex Mixed And Stromal Neoplasms 
M8930/0 Endometrial stromal nodule

M8930/3 Endometrial stromal sarcoma, NOS
 Endometrial sarcoma, NOS
 Endometrial stromal sarcoma, high grade

M8931/3 Endometrial stromal sarcoma, low grade
 Endolymphatic stromal myosis
 Endometrial stromatosis
 Stromal endometriosis
 Stromal myosis, NOS

M8932/0 Adenomyoma
 Atypical polypoid adenomyoma

M8933/3 Adenosarcoma

M8934/3 Carcinofibroma

M8935/0 Stromal tumor, benign

M9835/1 Stromal tumor, NOS

M8935/3 Stromal sarcoma, NOS

M8936/0 Gastrointestinal stromal tumor, benign
 GIST, benign

M8936/1 Gastrointestinal stromal tumor, NOS
 GIST, NOS/uncertain malignant potential
 Gastrointestinal autonomic nerve tumor (GANT)
 Gastrointestinal pacemaker cell tumor

M8936/3 Gastrointestinal stromal sarcoma
 GIST, malignant

M8940/0 Pleomorphic adenoma
 Mixed tumor, NOS
 Mixed tumor, salivary gland type, NOS
 Chondroid syringoma

M8940/3 Mixed tumor, malignant, NOS
 Mixed tumor, malignant, NOS
 Mixed tumor, salivary gland type, malignant
 Malignant chondroid syringoma

M8941/3 Carcinoma in pleomorphic adenoma

M8950/3 Mullerian mixed tumor

M8951/3 Mesodermal mixed tumor

M8959/0 Benign cystic nephroma

M8959/1 Cystic partially differentiated nephroblastoma

M8959/3 Malignant cystic nephroma
 Malignant multilocular cystic nephroma

M8960/1 Mesoblastic nephroma

M8960/3 Nephroblastoma, NOS
 Wilms's tumor
 Nephroma, NOS

M8963/3 malignant rhabdoid tumor
 Rhabdoid sarcoma
 Rhabdoid tumor, NOS

M8964/3 Clear cell sarcoma of kidney

M8965/0 Nephrogenic adenofibroma

M8966/0 Renomedullary interstitial cell tumor
 Renomedullary fibroma

M8967/0 Ossifying renal tumor

M8970/3 Hepatoblastoma
 Embryonal hepatoma

M8971/3 Pancreatoblastoma

M8972/3 Pulmonary blastoma
 Pneumoblastoma

M8973/3 Pleuropulmonary blastoma

M8974/1 Sialoblastoma

M8980/3 Carcinosarcoma, NOS

M8981/3 Carcinosarcoma, embryonal

M8982/0 Myoepithelioma
 Myoepithelial tumor
 Myoepithelial adenoma

M8982/3 Malignant myoepithelioma
 Myoepithelial carcinoma

M8983/0 Adenomyoepithelioma

M8990/0 Mesencymoma, benign

M8990/1 Mesenchymoma, NOS
 Mixed mesenchymal tumor

M8990/3 Mesenchymoma, malignant
 Mixed mesenchymal sarcoma

M8991/3 Embryonal sarcoma

9000–9030) Fibroepithelial Neoplasms 
M9000/0 Brenner tumor, NOS

M9000/1 Brenner tumor, borderline malignancy
 Brenner tumor, proliferating

M9000/3 Brenner tumor, malignant

M9010/0 Fibroadenoma, NOS

M9011/0 Intracanalicular fibroadenoma

M9012/0 Pericanalicular fibroadenoma

M9013/0 Adenofibroma, NOS
 Cystadenofibroma, NOS
 Papillary adenofibroma

M9014/0 Serous adenofibroma, NOS
 Serous cystadenofibroma, NOS

M9014/1 Serous adenofibroma of borderline malignancy
 Serous cystadenofibroma of borderline malignancy

M9014/3 Serous adenocarcinofibroma
 Malignant serous adenofibroma
 Serous cystadenocarcinofibroma
 Malignant serous cystadenofibroma

M9015/0 Mucinous adenofibroma, NOS
 Mucinous cystadenofibroma, NOS

M9015/1 Mucinous adenofibroma of borderline malignancy
 Mucinous cystadenofibroma of borderline malignancy

M9015/3 Mucinous adenocarcinofibroma
 Malignant mucinous adenofibroma
 Mucinous cystadenocarcinofibroma
 Malignant mucinous cystadenofibroma

M9016/0 Gian fibroadenoma

M9020/0 Phyllodes tumor, benign
 Cystosarcoma phyllodes, benign

M9020/1 Phyllodes tumor, borderline
 Cystosarcoma phyllodes, NOS
 Phyllodes tumor, NOS

M9020/3 Phyllodes tumor, malignant
 Cystosarcoma phyllodes, malignant

M9030/0 Juvenile fibroadenoma

904 Synovial-Like Neoplasms 
M9040/0 Synovioma, benign

M9040/3 Synovial sarcoma, NOS
 Synovioma, NOS
 Synovioma, malignant

M9041/3 Synovial sarcoma, spindle cell
 Synovial sarcoma, monophasic fibrous

M9042/3 Synovial sarcoma, epithelioid cell

M9043/3 Synovial sarcoma, biphasic

M9044/3 Clear cell sarcoma, NOS (except of kidney M9864/3)
 Clear cell sarcoma, of tendons and aponeuroses
 Melanoma, malignant, of soft parts

905 Mesothelial Neoplasms 
M9050/0 Mesothelioma, benign

M9050/3 Mesothelioma, malignant or NOS

M9051/0 Fibrous mesothelioma, benign

M9051/3 Fibrous mesothelioma, malignant or NOS
 Spindled mesothelioma
 Sarcomatoid mesothelioma
 Desmoplastic mesothelioma

M9052/0 Epithelioid mesothelioma, benign
 Well differentiated papillary mesothelioma, benign
 mesothelial papilloma

M9052/3 Epithelioid mesothelioma, malignant or NOS

M9053/3 Mesothelioma, biphasic, malignant or NOS

M9054/0 Adenomatoid tumor, NOS

M9055/0 Multicystic mesothelioma, benign
 Cystic mesothelioma, benign

M9055/1 cystic mesothelioma, NOS

906–909 Germ cell Neoplasms 
M9060/3 Dysgerminoma

M9061/3 Seminoma, NOS

M9062/3 Seminoma, anaplastic
 Seminoma with high mitotic index

M9063/3 Spermatocytic seminoma
 Spermatocytoma

M9064/2 Intratubular malignant germ cells
 Intratubular germ cell neoplasia

M9064/3 Germinoma
 Germ cell tumor, NOS

M9065/3 Germ cell tumor, nonseminomatous

M9070/3 Embryonal carcinoma, NOS
 Embryonal adenocarcinoma

M9071/3 Yolk sac tumor
 Endodermal sinus tumor
 Polyvesicular vitelline tumor
 Orchioblastoma
 Embryonal carcinoma, infantile
 Hepatoid yolk sac tumor

M9072/3 Polyembryoma
 Embryonal carcinoma, polyembryonal type

M9073/1 Gonadoblastoma
 Gonocytoma

M9080/0 Teratoma, benign
 Adult cystic teratoma
 Adult/cystic teratoma, NOS
 Teratoma, differentiated
 Mature teratoma

M9080/1 Teratoma, NOS
 Solid teratoma

M9080/3 Teratoma, malignant, NOS
 Embryonal teratoma
 Teratoblastoma, malignant
 Immature teratoma, malignant or NOS

M9081/3 Teratocarcinoma
 Mixed embryonal carcinoma and teratoma

M9082/3 malignant teratoma, undifferentiated
 Malignant teratoma, anaplastic

M9083/3 Malignant teratoma, intermediate

M9084/0 Dermoid cyst, NOS
 Dermoid, NOS

M9084/3 Teratoma with malignant transformation
 Dermoid cyst with malignant transformation or with secondary tumor

M9085/3 mixed germ cell tumor
 Mixed teratoma and seminoma

M9090/0 Struma ovarii, NOS

M9090/3 Struma ovarii, malignant

M9091/1 Strumal carcinoid
 Struma ovarii and carcinoid

910 Trophoblastic neoplasms 
M9100/0 Hydatidifrom mole, NOS
 Hydatid mole
 Complete hydatidiform mole

M9100/1 Invasive hydatidiform mole
 Chorioadenoma /destruens
 Chorioadenoma
 Invasive mole, NOS
 Malignant hydatidiform mole

M9100/3 Choriocarcinoma, NOS
 Chorionepithelioma
 Chorioepithelioma

M9101/3 Choriocarcinoma combined with other germ cell elements
 combined with teratoma
 combined with embryonal carcinoma

M9102/3 Malignant teratoma, trophoblastic

M9103/0 Partial hydatidiform mole

M9104/1 Placental site trophoblastic tumor

M9105/3 Trophoblastic tumor, epithelioid

911 Mesonephromas 
M9110/0 Mesonephroma, benign
 Mesonephric adenoma
 Wolffian duct adenoma

M9110/1 Mesonephric tumor, NOS
 Wolffian duct tumor

M9110/3 Mesonephroma, malignant
 Mesonephric adenocarcinoma
 Mesonephroma, NOS
 Wolffian duct carcinoma

912–916 Blood vessel tumors 
M9120/0 Hemangioma, NOS
 Angioma, NOS
 Chorioangioma

M9120/3 Hemangiosarcoma
 Angiosarcoma

M9121/0 Cavernous hemangioma

M9122/0 Venous hemangioma

M9123/0 Racemose hemangioma
 Arteriovenous hemangioma

M9124/3 Kupffer cell sarcoma

M9125/0 Epithelioid hemangioma
 Histiocytoid hemangioma

M9130/0 Hemangioendothelioma, benign

M9130/1 Hemangioendothelioma, NOS
 Angioendothelioma
 Kaposiform hemangioendothelioma

M9130/3 Hemangioendothelioma, malignant
 Hemangioendothelial sarcoma

M9131/0 Capillary hemangioma
 Hemangioma simplex
 Infantile/plexiform/juvenile hemangioma

M9132/0 Intramuscular hemangioma

M9133/1 Epithelioid hemangioendothelioma, NOS

M9133/3 Epithelioid hemangioendothelioma, malignant
 Intravascular bronchial alveolar tumor

M9135/1 Endovascular papillary angioendothelioma
 Dabska tumor

M9136/1 Spindle cell hemangioendothelioma
 Spindle cell angioendothelioma

M9140/3 Kaposi's sarcoma
 Multiple hemorrhagic sarcoma

M9141/0 Angiokeratoma

M9142/0 Verrucous keratotic hemangioma

M9150/0 Hemangiopericytoma, benign

M9150/1 Hemangiopericytoma, NOS
 Hemangiopericytic meningioma

M9150/3 Hemangiopericytoma, malignant

M9160/0 angiofibroma, NOS
 Juvenile angiofibroma
 Fibrous papule of nose
 Involuting nevus
 Giant cell or cellular angiofibroma

M9161/0 Acquired tufted hemangioma

M9161/1 Hemangioblastoma
 Angioblastoma

M9150/0 Hemangiopericytoma, benign

M9150/1 Hemangiopericytoma, NOS

917 Lymphatic vessel tumors 
M9170/0 Lymphangioma, NOS
 Lymphangioendothelioma, NOS

M9170/3 Lymphangiosarcoma
 Lymphangioendothelial sarcoma
 Lymphangioendothelioma, malignant

M9171/0 Capillary lymphangioma

M9172/0 Cavernous lymphangioma

M9173/0 Cystic lymphangioma
 Hygroma, NOS
 Cystic Hygroma

M9174/0 Lymphangiomyoma

M9174/1 Lymphangiomyomatosis
 Lymphangioleiomyomatosis

M9175/0 Hemolymphangioma

918–924 Osseous And Chondromatous neoplasms 
M9180/0 Osteoma, NOS

M9180/3 Osteosarcoma, NOS
 Osteogenic sarcoma, NOS
 Osteochondrosarcoma
 Osteoblastic sarcoma

M9181/3 Chondroblastic osteosarcoma

M9182/3 Fibroblastic osteosarcoma
Osteofibrosarcoma

M9183/3 Telangeictatic osteosarcoma

M9184/3 Osteosarcoma in Paget disease of bone

M9185/3 Small cell osteosarcoma
 Round cell osteosarcoma

M9186/3 Central osteosarcoma
 Conventional central osteosarcoma
 Medullary osteo sarcoma

M9187/3 Intraosseous well differentiated osteosarcoma
 Intraosseous low grade osteosarcoma

M9191/0 Osteoid osteoma, NOS

M9192/3 Parosteal osteosarcoma
 Juxtacortical osteosarcoma

M9193/3 Periosteal osteosarcoma

M9194/3 High grade surface osteosarcoma

M9195/3 Intracortical osteosarcoma

M9200/0 Osteoblastmoa, NOS
 Giant osteoid osteoma

M9200/1 Aggressive osteoblastoma

M9210/0 Osteochondroma
 Cartilagionus exostosis
 Cartilaginous exostosis
 Ecchondroma

M9210/1 Osteochondromatosis, NOS
 Ecchondrosis

M9220/0 Chondroma, NOS
 Enchondroma

M9220/1 Condromatosis, NOS

M9220/3 Chondrosarcoma, NOS
 Fibrochondrosarcoma

M9221/0 Juxtacortical chondroma
 Periosteal chondroma

M9221/3 Juxtacortical chondrosarcoma
 Periosteal chondrosarcoma

M9230/0 Chondroblastoma, NOS
 Chondromatous giant cell tumor
 Codman tumor

M9230/3 Chondroblastoma, malignant

M9231/3 Myxoid chondrosarcoma

M9240/3 Mesenchymal chondrosarcoma

M9241/0 Chondromyxoid fibroma

M9242/3 Clear cell chondrosarcoma

M9243/3 Dedifferentiated chondrosarcoma

925 Giant cell tumors 
M9250/1 giant cell tumor of bone, NOS
 Osteoclastoma, NOS

M9250/3 Giant cell tumor of bone, malignant
 Osteoclastoma, malignant
 Giant cell sarcoma of bone

M9251/1 Giant cell tumor of soft parts, NOS

M9251/3 Malignant giant cell tumor of soft parts

M9252/0 Tenosynovial giant cell tumor
 Fibrous histiocytoma of tendon sheath
 Giant cell tumor of tendon sheath

M9252/3 Malignant tenosynovial giant cell tumor
 Giant cell tumor of tendon sheath, malignant

926 Miscellaneous bone tumors (C40._, C41._) 
M9260/3 Ewing's sarcoma/tumor

M9261/3 Adamantinoma of long bones

M9262/0 Ossifying fibroma
 Fibro-osteoma
 Osteofibroma

927–934 Odontogenic tumors C41._) 
M9270/0 Odontogenic tumor, benign

M9270/1 Odontogenic tumor, NOS

M9270/3 Odontogenic tumor, malignant
 Odontogenic carcinoma/sarcoma
 Primary intraosseous or ameloblastic carcinoma

M9271/0 Ameloblastic fibrodentinoma
 Dentinoma

M9272/0 Cementoma, NOS
 Periapical cemental dysplasia or cemento-osseus dysplasia

M9273/0 Cementoblastoma, benign

M9274/0 Cementifying fibroma
 Cemento-ossifying fibroma

M9275/0 Gigantiform cementoma
 Florid osseus dysplasia

M9280/0 Odontoma, NOS

M9281/0 Compound odontoma

M9282/0 Complex odontoma

M9290/0 Ameloblastic fibro-odontoma
 Fibroameloblastic odontoma

M9290/3 Ameloblastic odontosarcoma
 Ameloblastic fibrodentinosarcoma or fibro-odontosarcoma

M9300/0 Adenomatoid odontogenic tumor
 Adenomeloblastoma

M9301/0 Calcifying odontogenic cyst

M9302/0 Odontogenic ghost cell tumor

M9310/0 Ameloblastoma, NOS
 Adamantinoma, NOS (except of long bones M9261/3)

M9310/3 Ameloblastoma, malignant
 Adamantinoma, NOS (except of long bones M9261/3)

M9311/0 Odontoameloblastoma

M9312/0 Squamous odontogenic tumor

M9320/0 Odontogenic myxoma
 Odontogenic myxofibroma

M9321/0 Central odontogenic fibroma
 Odontogenic fibroma, NOS

M9322/0 Peripheral odontogenic fibroma

M9330/0 Ameloblastic fibroma

M9330/3 Ameloblastic fibrosarcoma
 Ameloblastic sarcoma
 Odontogenic fibrosarcoma

M9340/0 Calcifying epithelial odontogenic tumor
 Pindbord tumor

M9341/1 clear cell odontogenic tumor

M9342/3 Odontogenic carcinosarcoma

935–937 Miscellaneous tumors 
M9350/1 Craniopharyngioma
 Rathke pouch tumor

M9351/1 Craniopharyngioma, adamantinomatous

M9352/1 Craniopharyngioma, papillary

M9360/1 Pinealoma

M9361/1 Pineocytoma

M9362/3 Pineoblastoma
 Mixed pineal tumor
 Mixed pineocytoma-pineoblastoma
 Pineal parenchymal tumor of intermediate differentiation
 Transitional pineal tumor

M9363/0 Melanotic neuroectodermal tumor
 Retinal anlage tumor
 Melanoameloblastoma
 Melanotic progonoma

M9364/3 Peripheral neuroectodermal tumor
 Neuroectodermal tumor, NOS

Peripheral primitive neuroectodermal tumor, NOS (PPNET)

M9365/3 Askin Tumor

M9370/3 Chordoma, NOS

M9371/3 Chondroid chordoma

M9372/3 Dedifferentiated chorcoma

M9373/0 Parachordoma

938–948 Gliomas 
M9380/3 Glioma, malignant
 Glioma, NOS (except nasal glioma, not neoplastic)

M9381/3 Gliomatosis cerebri

M9382/3 Mixed glioma
 oligoastrocytoma
 Anaplastic oligoastrocytoma

M9383/1 Subepyndymoma
 Subependymal glioma
 Subependymal astrocytoma, NOS
 Mixed subendymoma-ependymoma

M9384/1 Subependymal giant cell astrocytoma

M9390/0 Choroid plexus papilloma, NOS

M9390/1 Atypical choroid plexus papilloma

M9390/3 Choroid plexus carcinoma
 Choroid plexus papilloma, anaplastic or malignant

M9391/3 Ependymoma, NOS
 Epithelial / cellular / clear cell / tanycytic ependymoma

M9392/3 Ependymoma, anaplastic
 Ependymoblastoma

M9393/3 Papillary ependymoma

M9394/1 Myxopapillary ependymoma

M9400/3 Astrocytoma, NOS
 Astrocytic glioma
 Astroglioma
 Diffuse astrocytoma
 Astrocytoma, low grade
 Diffuse astocytoma, low grade
 Cystic astrocytoma

M9401/3 Astrocytoma, anaplastic

M9410/3 Protoplasmic astrocytoma

M9411/3 Gemistocytic astrocytoma
 Gemistocytoma

M9412/1 Desmoplastic infantile astrocytoma or ganglioglioma

M9413/0 dysembryoplastic neuroepithelial tumor

M9420/3 Fibrillary astrocytoma
 Fibrous astrocytoma

M9421/1 Pilocytic astrocytoma
 Piloid or Juvenile astrocytoma
 Spongioblastoma, NOS

M9423/3 Polar spongioblastoma
 Spongioblastoma polare
 Primitive polar spongioblastoma

M9424/3 Pleomorphic xanthoastrocytoma

M9430/3 Astroblastoma

M9440/3 Glioblastoma, NOS
 Glioblastoma multiforme
 Spongioblastoma multiforme

M9441/3 Giant cell glioblastoma
 Monstrocellular sarcoma

M9442/1 gliofibroma

M9442/3 gliosarcoma
 Glioblastoma with sarcomatous component

M9444/1 Chordoid glioma
 Chordoid glioma of third ventricle

M9450/3 Oligodendroglioma, NOS

M9451/3 Oligodendroglioma, anaplastic

M9460/3 Oligodendroblastoma

M9470/3 Medullablastoma, NOS
 Melanotic medulloblastoma

M9471/3 Desmoplastic nodular medulloblastoma
 Desmoplastic medulloblastoma
 Circumscribed arachnoidal cerebellar sarcoma

M9472/3 Medullomyoblastoma

M9473/3 Primitive neuroectodermal tumor, NOS
 PNET, NOS
 Central primitive neuroectodermal tumor, NOS (CPNET)
 Supratentorial PNET

M9474/3 large cell medulloblastoma

M9480/3 Cerebellar sarcoma, NOS

949–952 Neuroepitheliomatous neoplasms 
M9490/0 Ganglioneuroma

M9490/3 Ganglioneuroblastoma

M9491/0 Ganglioneuromatosis

M9492/0 Gangliocytoma

M9493/0 Dysplastic gangliocytoma of cerebellum (Lhermitte-Duclos)

M9500/3 Neuroblastoma, NOS
 Sympathicoblastoma
 Central neuroblastoma

M9501/0 Medulloepithelioma, benign
 Diktyoma, benign

M9501/3 Medulloepithelioma, NOS
 Diktyoma, malignant

M9502/0 Teratoid medulloepithelioma, benign

M9502/3 Teratoid medulloepithelioma

M9503/3 Neuroepithelioma, NOS

M9504/3 Spongioneuroblastoma

M9505/1 Ganglioglioma, NOS

M9505/3 Ganglioglioma, anaplastic

M9506/1 Central neurocytoma
 Neurocytoma
 Cerebellar liponeurocytoma
 Lipomatous medulloblastoma
 Neurolipocytoma
 Medullocytoma

M9507/0 Pacinian tumor

M9508/3 Atypical teratoid/rhabdoid tumor

M9510/0 Retinocytoma

M9510/3 Retinoblastoma, NOS

M9511/3 Retinoblastoma, differentiated

M9512/3 Retinoblastoma, undifferentiated

M9513/3 Retinoblastoma, diffuse

M9514/1 Retinoblastoma, spontaneously regressed

M9520/3 Olfactory neurogenic tumor

M9521/3 Olfactory neurocytoma
 Esthesioneurocytoma

M9522/3 Olfactory neuroblastoma
 Esthesioneuroblastoma

M9523/3 Olfactory neuroepithelioma
 Esthesio neuroepithelioma

953 Meningiomas 
M9530/0 Meningioma, NOS
 Microcystic
 Secretory
 Lymphoplasmacyte-rich
 Metaplastic

M9530/1 Meningiomatosis, NOS
 Diffuse
 Multiple meningiomas

M9530/3 Meningioma, malignant
 Anaplastic
 Leptomeningeal sarcoma
 Meningeal sarcoma
 Meningothelial sarcoma

M9531/0 Meningothelial meningioma
 Endotheliomatous meningioma
 Syncytial meningioma

M9532/0 Fibrous meningioma
 Fibroblastic meningioma

M9533/0 Psammomatous meningioma

M9534/0 Angiomatous meningioma

M9537/0 Transitional meningioma

M9538/1 Clear cell meningioma
 Chordoid

M9538/3 Papillary meningioma
 Rhabdoid

M9539/1 Atypical meningioma

M9539/3 Meningeal sarcomatosis

954–957 Nerve sheath tumors 
M9540/0 Neurofibroma, NOS

M9540/1 Neurofibromatosis, NOS
 Multiple neurofibromatosis
 Von Recklinghausen disease (except of bone)

M9540/3 Malignant peripheral nerve sheath tumor
 MPNST, NOS
 MPNST with glandular differentiation
 Epithelioid
 with mesenchymal differentiation
 Melanotic
 Melanotic psammomatous

M9541/0 Melanotic neurofibroma

M9550/0 Plexiform neurofibroma
 Plexiform neuroma

M9560/0 Neurilemoma, NOS
 Schwannoma, NOS
 Neurinoma
 Acoustic neuroma
 Pigmented or melanotic schwannoma
 Plexiform / cellular / degenerated / ancient / psammomatous

M9560/1 Neurinomatosis

M9561/3 Malignant peripheral nerve sheath tumor with rhabdomyoblastic differentiation
 MPNST with rhabdomyoblastic differentiation
 Triton tumor, malignant
 Malignant schwannoma with rhabdomyoblastic differentiation

M9562/0 Neurothekeoma
 Nerve sheath myxoma

M9570/0 Neuroma, NOS

M9571/0 Perineurioma, NOS
 Intraneural perineurioma
 Soft tissue perineurioma

M9571/3 Perineurioma, malignant
 Perineural MPNST

M9560/0 Schwannoma, NOS

M9560/0 Neurinoma

M9560/0 Acoustic neuroma

M9570/0 Neuroma, NOS

958 Granular cell tumors and Alveolar soft part sarcoma 
M9580/0 Granular cell tumor/myoblastoma, NOS

M9580/3 Granular cell tumor/myoblastoma, malignant

M9581/3 Alveolar soft part sarcoma

M9582/0 Granular cell tumor of the sellar region (C75.1)

(9590–9999) Hematologic (Leukemias, Lymphomas and related disorders)

959 Malignant lymphoma, NOS, Or diffuse 
M9590/3 Malignant Lymphoma, NOS
 Lymphoma, NOS
 Microglioma (C71._)

M9591/3 Malignant lymphoma, non-Hodgkin, NOS
 Non-Hodgkin's lymphoma, NOS
 B cell lymphoma, NOS
 Malignant lymphoma, non-cleaved cell, NOS
 Malignant lymphoma, diffuse, NOS
 Malignant lymphoma, lymphocytic, intermediate differentiation, nodular
 Malignant lymphoma, small cell, noncleaved, diffuse
 Malignant lymphoma, undifferentiated cell, non-Burkitt
 Malignant lymphoma, undifferentiated cell type, NOS
 Lymphosarcoma, NOS
 Lymphosarcoma, diffuse
 Reticulum cell sarcoma, NOS
 Reticulum cell sarcoma, diffuse
 Reticulosarcoma, NOS
 Reticulosarcoma, diffuse
 Malignant lymphoma, small cleaved cell, diffuse
 Malignant lymphoma, lymphocytic, poorly differentiated, diffuse
 Malignant lymphoma, small cleaved cell, NOS
 Malignant lymphoma, cleaved cell, NOS

M9596/3 Composite Hodgkin and non-Hodgkin lymphoma

965–966 Hodgkin Lymphoma 
M9650/3 Hodgkin lymphoma, NOS
 Hodgkin's disease, NOS
 Malignant lymphoma, Hodgkin

M9651/3 Hodgkin lymphoma, lymphocyte rich
 Lymphocyte-rich classical Hodgkin lymphoma
 Hodgkin disease, lymphocyte predominance, NOS
 Hodgkin disease, lymphocytic-histiocytic predominance
 Hodgkin disease, lymphocyte predominance, diffuse

M9652/3 Mixed cellularity classical Hodgkin lymphoma, NOS
 Hodgkin lymphoma, mixed cellularity, NOS

M9653/3 Lymphocyte-depleted classical Hodgkin lymphoma, NOS

M9654/3 Hodgkin lymphoma, lymphocyte depletion, diffuse fibrosis

M9655/3 Hodgkin lymphoma, lymphocyte depletion, reticular

M9659/3 Nodular lymphocyte predominant Hodgkin lymphoma
 Hodgkin lymphoma, lymphocyte predominance, nodular
 Hodgkin paragranuloma, NOS
 Hodgkin paragranuloma, nodular

M9661/3 Hodgkin granuloma

M9662/3 Hodgkin sarcoma

M9663/3 Nodular sclerosis classical Hodgkin lymphoma
 Hodgkin lymphoma, nodular sclerosis, NOS

M9664/3 Hodgkin lymphoma, nodular sclerosis, cellular phase
 Classical Hodgkin lymphoma, nodular sclerosis, cellular phase

M9665/3 Hodgkin lymphoma, nodular sclerosis, grade 1
 Classical Hodgkin lymphoma, nodular sclerosis grade 1
 Hodgkin disease, nodular sclerosis, lymphocyte predominance
 Hodgkin disease, nodular sclerosis, mixed cellularity

M9667/3 Hodgkin lymphoma, nodular sclerosis, grade 2
 Classical Hodgkin lymphoma, nodular sclerosis, grade 2
 Hodgkin disease, nodular sclerosis, lymphocyte depletion
 Hodgkin disease, nodular sclerosis, syncytial variant

967–972 Non-Hodgkin Lymphomas

967–969 Mature B-cell Lymphomas 
M9670/3 Malignant lymphoma, small B lymphocytic, NOS (see also M9823/3)
 Small lymphocytic lymphoma
 Malignant lymphoma, small lymphocytic, NOS
 Malignant lymphoma, lymphocytic, well differentiated, diffuse
 Malignant lymphoma, lymphocytic, NOS
 Malignant lymphoma, lymphocytic, diffuse, NOS
 Malignant lymphoma, small cell, NOS
 Malignant lymphoma, small lymphocytic, diffuse
 Malignant lymphoma, small cell diffuse

M9671/3 Malignant lymphoma, lymphoplasmacytic (see also M9761/3)
 Lymphoplasmacytic lymphoma
 Malignant lymphoma, lymphoplasmacytoid
 Immunocytoma
 Malignant lymphoma, plasmacytoid
 Plasmacytic lymphoma

M9673/3 Mantle cell lymphoma
 Includes all variants: blastic, pleomorphic, small cell
 Mantle zone lymphoma
 Malignant zone lymphoma
 Malignant lymphoma, lymphocytic, intermediate differentiation, diffuse
 Malignant lymphoma, centrocytic
 Malignant lymphomatous polyposis

M9675/3 Malignant lymphoma, mixed small and large cell, diffuse (see also M9690/3)
 Malignant lymphoma, mixed lymphocytic-histiocytic, diffuse
 Malignant lymphoma, mixed cell type, diffuse
 Malignant lymphoma, centroblastic-centrocytic, NOS
 Malignant lymphoma, centroblastic-centrocytic, diffuse

M9678/3 Primary effusion lymphoma

M9679/3 Mediastinal large B-cell lymphoma (C38.3)
 Mediastinal (thymic) large cell lymphoma

M9680/3 Malignant lymphoma, large B-cell, diffuse, NOS
 Diffuse large B-cell lymphoma, NOS
 Malignant lymphoma, large cell, NOS
 Malignant lymphoma, large B-cell, NOS
 Malignant lymphoma, histiocytic, NOS
 Malignant lymphoma, histiocytic, diffuse
 Malignant lymphoma, large cell, cleaved and noncleaved
 Malignant lymphoma, large cell, diffuse, NOS
 Malignant lymphoma, large cleaved cell, NOS
 Malignant lymphoma, large cell, cleaved, NOS
 Malignant lymphoma, large cell, noncleaved, diffuse or NOS
 Malignant lymphoma, large B-cell, diffuse, centroblastic, NOS
 Malignant lymphoma, large B-cell, centroblastic, NOS or diffuse
 Intravascular large B-cell lymphoma
 Angioendotheliomatosis
 Angiotropic lymphoma
 T-cell rich large B-cell lymphoma
 Histiocyte-rich large B-cell lymphoma
 Anaplastic large B-cell lymphoma

M9684/3 Malignant lymphoma, large B-cell, diffuse, immunoblastic, NOS
 Malignant lymphoma, immunoblastic, NOS
 Immunoblastic sarcoma
 Malignant lymphoma, large cell, immunoblastic
 Plasmablastic lymphoma

M9687/3 Burkitt lymphoma, NOS (see also M9826/3)
 Includes all variants
 Malignant lymphoma, undifferentiated
 Malignant lymphoma, small noncleaved
 Burkitt-like lymphoma

M9689/3 Splenic marginal zone lymphoma
 Splenic marginal zone B-cell lymphoma
 Splenic lymphoma with villous lymphocytes

M9690/3 Follicular lymphoma, NOS (see also M9675/3)
 Malignant lymphoma, follicular/follicle center, NOS

M9691/3 Follicular lymphoma, grade 2
 Follicular lymphoma, small cleaved cell

M9698/3 Follicular lymphoma, grade 3
 Malignant lymphoma, large cell/centroblastic, follicular, NOS

M9699/3 Marginal zone B-cell lymphoma, NOS
 Marginal zone lymphoma, NOS
 Extranodal marginal zone B-cell lymphoma of mucosa-associated lymphoid tissue (MALT-lymphoma)
 BALT lymphoma
 SALT lymphoma
 Monocytoid b-cell lymphoma
 Nodal marginal zone lymphoma
 Nodal marginal zone B-cell lymphoma

970–971 Mature T- and NK-cell Lymphomas 
M9700/3 Mycosis fungoides
 Pagetoid reticulosis

M9701/3 Sezary syndrome
 Sezary disease

M9702/3 Mature T-cell lymphoma, NOS
 Peripheral T-cell lymphoma, NOS
 T-cell lymphoma, NOS
 Peripheral T-cell lymphoma, pleomorphic small/medium/large cell/T-zone lymphoma
 Lymphoepithelioid lymphoma
 Lennert lymphoma

M9705/3 Angioimmunoblastic T-cell lymphoma
 Peripheral T-cell lymphoma, AILD (Angioimmunoblastic lymphadenopathy with dysproteinemia)

M9708/3 Subcutaneous panniculitis-like T-cell lymphoma

M9709/3 Cutaneous T-cell lymphoma, NOS (C44._)
 Cutaneous lymphoma, NOS

M9714/3 Anaplastic large cell lymphoma, T cell and Null cell type
 Anaplastic large cell lymphoma, CD30+/NOS

M9716/3 Hepatosplenic (gamma-delta) cell lymphoma
 Hepatosplenic T-cell lymphoma

M9717/3 Intestinal T-cell lymphoma
 Enteropathy type T-cell lymphoma

M9718/3 Primary cutaneous CD 30+ T-cell lymphoproliferative disorder (C44._)
 Lymphomatoid papulosis
 Primary cutaneous anaplastic large cell lymphoma
 Primary cutaneous CD30+ large T-cell lymphoma

M9719/3 NK/T-cell lymphoma, nasal and nasal type
 Extranodal NK/T cell lymphoma, nasal type
 T/NK-cell lymphoma

972 Precursor Cell Lymphoblastic Lymphoma 
M9727/3 Precursor cell lymphoblastic lymphoma, NOS (see also M9835/3)
 Blastic NK cell lymphoma
 Malignant lymphoma, lymphoblastic, NOS

M9728/3 Precursor B-cell lymphoblastic Lymphoma (see also M9836/3)

M9729/3 Precursor T-cell lymphoblastic Lymphoma (see also M9837/3)

973 Plasma cell tumors 
M9731/3 Plasmacytoma, NOS
 Extramedullary plasmacytoma
 Solitary plasmacytoma of bone (C40._, C41._)
 Solitary myeloma
 Solitary plasmacytoma

M9732/3 Multiple myeloma (C42.1)
 Plasma cell myeloma
 Myeloma, NOS
 Myelomatosis

M9733/3 Plasma cell leukemia (C42.1)
 Plasmacytic leukemia

M9734/3 Plasmacytoma, extramedullary (not occurring in bone)
 Extraosseous plasmacytoma

974 Mast cell Tumors 
M9740/1 Mastocytoma, NOS or Extracutaneous mastocytoma
 Mast cell tumor, NOS

M9740/3 Mast cell sarcoma
 Malignant mast cell tumor
 Malignant mastocytoma

M9741/3 Malignant mastocytosis
 Systemic tissue mast cell disease
 Aggressive systemic mastocytosis or Systemic mastocytosis with associated clonal, hematological non-mast cell lineage disease

M9742/3 Mast cell leukemia (C42.1)

975 Neoplasms of Histiocytes and Accessory Lymphoid Cells 
M9750/3 Malignant histiocytosis

M9751/1 Langerhans cell histiocytosis, NOS

M9752/1 Langerhans cell histiocytosis, unifocal
 Langerhans cell granulomatosis, unifocal
 Langerhans cell histiocytosis, mono-ostotic
 Eosinophilic granuloma

M9753/1 Langerhans cell histiocytosis, multifocal
 Langerhans cell histiocytosis, poly-ostotic

M9754/3 Langerhans cell histiocytosis, disseminated
 Langerhans cell histiocytosis, generalized
 Letterer-Siwe disease
 Acute progressive histiocytosis X

M9755/3 Histiocytic sarcoma
 True histiocytic lymphoma

M9756/3 Langerhans cell sarcoma

M9757/3 Dendritic cell sarcoma, NOS
 Interdigitating dendritic cell sarcoma/tumor

M9758/3 Follicular dendritic cell sarcoma/tumor

976 Immunoproliferative diseases 
M9760/3 Immunoproliferative disease, NOS

M9761/3 Waldenstrom macroglobulinemia (C42.0) (see also M9671/3)

M9762/3 Heavy chain disease, NOS
 Alpha heavy chain disease
 Mu heavy chain disease
 Gamma heavy chain disease
 Franklin disease

M9764/3 Immunoproliferative small intestinal disease (C17._)
 Mediterranean lymphoma
 Primary small intestinal extranodal marginal zone lymphoma
 
M9765/1 Monoclonal gammopathy of undetermined significance
 MGUS
 Monoclonal gammopathy, NOS

(M9766/1) Angiocentric immunoproliferative lesion
 LYmphoid granulomatosis
 Lymphomatoid granulomatosis

M9767/1 Angioimmunoblastic lymphadenopathy

M9768/1 T-gamma lymphoproliferative disease

M9769/1 Immunoglobulin deposition disease
 Systemic light chain disease
 Primary amyloidosis

980–994 Leukemias

980) Leukemias, NOS 
M9800/3 Leukemia, NOS

M9801/3 Acute leukemia, NOS
 Blast cell leukemia
 Undifferentiated leukemia
 Stem cell leukemia

M9805/3 Acute biphenotypic leukemia
 Acute leukemia of ambiguous lineage
 Acute mixed lineage leukemia
 Acute bilineal leukemia

(982–983) Lymphoid leukemias (C42.1) 
M9820/3 Lymphoid leukemia, NOS
 Lymphocytic leukemia, NOS
 Lymphatic leukemia, NOS

M9823/3 B-cell chronic lymphocytic leukemia/small lymphocytic lymphoma (see also M9670/3)
 Chronic lymphocytic leukemia, B-cell type (includes all variants of BCLL)
 Chronic lymphocytic leukemia
 Chronic lymphoid leukemia
 Chronic lymphatic leukemia

M9826/3 Burkitt cell Leukemia (see also M9687/3)
 Acute lymphoblastic leukemia, mature B-cell type

M9827/3 Adult T-cell leukemia/lymphoma (HTLV-1 positive) includes all variants
 Adult T-cell lymphoma/leukemia

M9831/1 T-cell large granular lymphocytic leukemia
 T-cell large granular lymphocytosis
 NK-cell large granular lymphocytic leukemia
 Large granular lymphocytosis, NOS

M9832/3 Prolymphocytic leukemia, NOS

M9833/3 B-cell prolymphocytic leukemia

M9834/3 T-cell prolymphocytic leukemia

M9835/3 Precursor cell lymphoblastic leukemia, NOS (see also M9727/3)
 Precursor cell lymphoblastic leukemia, not phenotyped
 Acute lymphoblastic leukemia, NOS (see also M9727/3)
 Acute lymphoblastic leukemia, precursor-cell type
 Acute lymphoblastic leukemia-lymphoma, NOS
 Acute lymphocytic leukemia
 Acute lymphoid leukemia
 Acute lymphatic leukemia
 Acute lymphoblastic leukemia, L2 type, NOS
 FAB L2

M9836/3 Precursor B lymphoblastic leukemia (see also M9728/3)
 Pro-B ALL
 Common precursor B ALL
 Pre-B ALL
 Pre-pre-B ALL
 Common ALL
 c-ALL

M9837/3 Precursor T lymphoblastic leukemia (see also M9729/3)
 Pro-T ALL
 Pre-T ALL
 Cortical T ALL
 Mature T ALL

984–993 Myeloid Leukemias (C42.1) 
(9840–9849) Erythroleukemias (FAB-M6)

M9840/3 Acute myeloid leukemia, M6 type
 Acute erythroid leukemia
 Erythroleukemia
 FAB M6
 AML M6
 Erythremic myelosis, NOS

(9850–9859) Lymphosarcoma cell leukemia
(9860–9869) Myeloid (Granulocytic) Leukemias

M9860/3 Myeloid leukemia, NOS
 Non-lymphocytic leukemia, NOS
 Granulocytic leukemia, NOS
 Myelogenous leukemia, NOS
 Myelomonocytic leukemia, NOS
 Myelocytic leukemia, NOS
 Eosinophilic leukemia
 Monocytic leukemia, NOS

M9861/3 Acute myeloid leukemia, NOS (FAB or WHO type not specified (see also M9930/3)
 Acute myelogenous leukemia
 Acute non-lymphocytic leukemia
 Acute granulocytic leukemia
Acute myelogenous leukemia
 Acute myelocytic leukemia

M9863/3 Chronic myeloid leukemia, NOS
 Chronic myelogenous leukemia, NOS
 Chronic granulocytic leukemia, NOS
 Chronic myelocytic leukemia, NOS

M9866/3 Acute promyelocytic leukemia t(15;17)(q22;q11–12)  * Acute promyelocytic leukemia, PML/RAR-alpha
Acute myeloid leukemia, t(15:17(q22;q11–12)
 Acute promyelocytic leukemia, NOS

FAB-M3 (includes all variants)
 Acute promyelocytic leukemia (AML with t(15;17)(q22;q12), PML-RARa and variants)

M9867/3) Acute myelomonocytic leukemia
 Acute myelomonocytic leukemia
 FAB-M4

M9870/3 Basophilic leukemia or Acute basophilic leukemia

M9871/3 Acute myeloid leukemia with abnormal marrow eosinophils (includes all variants)
 AML with inv(16)(p13q22) or t(16;16)(p13;q22), CBFb/MYH11 (FAB M4Eo)

M9872/3 Acute myeloid leukemia, minimally differentiated (FAB type M0)
 Acute myeloblastic leukemia]

M9873/3 Acute myeloid leukemia, without maturation (FAB type M1)

M9874/3 Acute myeloid leukemia, with maturation (FAB M2), NOS

M9875/3 Chronic myelogenous leukemia BCR/ABL positive
 Philadelphia chromosome (Ph1 positive)
 t(9;22)(q34;q11)
 Chronic granulocytic leukemia (BCR/ABL positive)/(Ph1 positive)/t(9;22)(q34;q11)

M9876/3 Atypical chronic myelogenous leukemia BCR/ABL negative
 Atypical chronic myeloid leukemia (BCR/ABL negative)/(Ph1 negative)

M9891/3 Acute monoblastic and monocytic leukemia
 Monoblastic leukemia, NOS
 FAB M5 (includes all variants)

M9895/3 Acute myeloid leukemia multilineage dysplasia
 AML with/without prior myelodysplastic syndrome

M9896/3 AML with t(8;21)(q22;q22), AML1/ETO
 FAB M2 with t(8;21)(q22;q22), AML1/ETO

M9897/3 AML with 11q23 (MLL) abnormalities
 AML, MLL

M9910/3 Acute megakaryoblastic leukemia, NOS
 Megakaryocytic leukemia
 (FAB-M7)

M9920/3 Acute myeloid leukemia and myelodysplastic syndrome, therapy related, NOS
Therapy-related acute myeloid leukemia, alkylating agent/epipodophyllotoxin related

M9930/3 Chloroma or Myeloid sarcoma (see also M9861/3)
 Granulocytic sarcoma

M9931/3) Acute panmyelosis with myelofibrosis (C42.1)
 Acute panmyelosis, NOS
 Acute myelofibrosis
 Acute myelosclerosis, NOS

994 Other Leukemias (C42.1) 
M9940/3 Hairy cell leukemia (C42.1)
 Hairy cell leukemia variant
 Leukemic reticuloendotheliosis

M9945/3 Chronic myelomonocytic, leukemia, NOS
 Type 1
 Type 2

M9946/3 Juvenile myelomonocytic leukemia

M9948/3 Aggressive NK cell leukemia

995–996 Chronic Myeloproliferative Disorders (C42.1) 
M9950/3 Polycythemia vera
 Polycythemia rubra vera
 Proliferative polycythemia

M9960/1 Chronic Myeloproliferative disease, NOS

M9961/3 Myelosclerosis with myeloid metaplasia
 Chronic idiopathic myelofibrosis
 Myelofibrosis as a result of myeloproliferative disease
 Agnogenic myeloid metaplasia
 Megakaryocytic myelosclerosis
 Myelofibrosis with myeloid metaplasia

M9962/3 Essential thrombocytemia
 Idiopathic thrombocythemia
 Essential/idiopathic hemorrhagic thrombocythemia

M9963/3 Chronic neutrophilic leukemia

M9964/3 Chronic eosinophilic leukemia / hypereosinophilic syndrome

997 Other Haematologic Disorders 
M9970/1 Lymphoproliferative disease/disorder, NOS
 Post-transplant lymphoproliferative disorder, pleomorphic

M9975/3 Myeloproliferative disease, NOS
 Chronic Myeloproliferative disease, unclassifiable
 Myelodysplastic / myeloproliferative diseases, unclassifiable

998 Myelodysplastic syndrome (C42.1) 
M9980/3 Chronic myelomonocytic leukemia or Refractory anemia

M9982/3 Refractory anemia with ringed sideroblasts
 with sideroblasts

M9983/3 Refractory anemia with excess blasts
 RAEB
RAEB I
 RAEB II

M9985/3 Refractory cytopenia with multilineage dysplasia

M9986/3 Myelodysplastic syndrome associated with isolated del(5q) chromosome abnormality

M9989/3 Myelodysplastic syndrome, NOS

See also 
 Medical classification

References

External links 
 Official page at World Health Organization
 Tutorial at National Cancer Institute
 Overview at DIMDI
 Overview of multiple primaries at healthyarkansas.com (PPT)
 History of versions at National Cancer Institute
 ICD-10 Codes for Neoplasms

Morphology 
 Cancer.gov – overview, includes link to Excel spreadsheet with codes at National Cancer Institute
 Overview at National Cancer Institute
 Word document – malignancies only at National Cancer Institute
 Overview at University hospital Gießen und Marburg
 Download table German version  at DIMDI
 Codes at IARC
 1st, 2nd, and 3rd editions at wolfbane.com
 List at The National Cancer Registry Ireland
 List  at London School of Hygiene & Tropical Medicine

International Classification of Diseases
Diagnosis classification
Oncology